= Kew (disambiguation) =

Kew is a place in the London Borough of Richmond upon Thames, England.

Kew may also refer to:

== Places ==
- Kew, New South Wales, Australia
- Kew, Victoria, Australia
  - City of Kew, former local government area
  - Electoral district of Kew
- Kew, Foothills County, Alberta, Canada
- Kew, Dunedin, New Zealand
- Kew, Invercargill, New Zealand
- Kew, Gauteng, Johannesburg, South Africa
- Kew, Merseyside, England, United Kingdom
  - Kew (Sefton ward), a local electoral district
- Kew (Richmond upon Thames ward), an electoral ward in Greater London, England
- Kew, Turks and Caicos Islands, United Kingdom
- Kew, Michigan, United States

== People ==
- Kew (personal name), a surname and given name, including a list of people
- Qiū (surname), sometimes transliterated as Kew
- Kew, a Welsh saint who gave his name to St Kew, in Cornwall, England

== Other uses ==
- Keewaywin Airport, Ontario, Canada, IATA code KEW
- Kew Magazine published by the Royal Botanic Gardens, Kew (KEW)

== See also ==
- Kew Gardens (disambiguation)
- Kew railway station (disambiguation)
- Kew. Rhone., an album by John Greaves and Peter Blegvad
- Kinetic energy weapon
- Q, a letter
