= Southport station =

Southport station may refer to:

== England ==
- Southport railway station, in Southport, Merseyside
- Southport Ash Street railway station, a former station in Southport, Lancashire
- Southport Central railway station, a former station in Southport, Lancashire
- Southport Eastbank Street railway station, a former station in Southport, Merseyside
- Southport London Street railway station, a former station in Southport, Merseyside
- Southport Lord Street railway station, a former station in Southport, Lancashire

== Australia ==
- Southport railway station, Queensland, (redirect to South Coast railway line, Queensland)
- Southport light rail station, a public transport interchange in Southport, Queensland
- Southport South light rail station, in Southport, Queensland
- Southport Transit Centre, in Southport, Queensland

== United States ==
- Southport station (CTA), an 'L' station in Chicago, Illinois
- Southport station (Metro-North), a commuter rail station in Southport, Connecticut

== Other stations in Southport, Merseyside ==
- Butts Lane Halt railway station
- Churchtown railway station, now closed
- Crossens railway station, now closed
- Hesketh Park railway station, now closed
- Hillside railway station
- Kew Gardens railway station (Merseyside), now closed
- Meols Cop railway station
- St Luke's railway station, now closed

== Other stations in Southport, Queensland ==
- Broadwater Parklands light rail station
- Griffith University light rail station
- Nerang Street light rail station
- Queen Street light rail station

== Radio stations ==
- Dune FM, a former Independent Local Radio station serving Southport, England, and surrounding areas
- Sandgrounder Radio, serving Southport and the North West Coast of England
- WAZO, licensed to Southport, North Carolina, United States
- WICC-FM, licensed to Southport, Connecticut, United States
- WOKN, licensed to Southport, New York, United States

== Other ==
- Southport power station, a former electricity generating station in Southport, Lancashire, England
- Pacific Cable Station, a former telegraph station in Southport, Queensland, Australia
