= Altcar =

Altcar may refer to:

- Great Altcar, a village and civil parish in West Lancashire, England
- Little Altcar, a village in Merseyside, England
- Altcar Bob, a defunct railway service on the Barton branch of the Liverpool, Southport and Preston Junction Railway

== See also ==
- Alternative propulsion
- Altcar Training Camp
- Altcar Rifle Range railway station
- Altcar and Hillhouse railway station
