= L&YR railmotors =

British steam railcar classes (1905–1948)

Type and origin
- Builder: Kerr, Stuart and Company
- Build date: 1905
- Total produced: 4 (Two Taff Vale Railway, two L&YR)
Specifications
- Configuration
  - Whyte: 0-2-2T, with semi-trailer
- Driver dia.: 2 ft 10 in (0.864 m)
- Trailing dia.: 2 ft 10 in (0.864 m)
- Length: 58 ft 8 in (17,882 mm); 45 ft (13,716 mm) (trailer)
- Loco weight: 37 long tons 10 cwt 2 qr (84,060 lb or 38.13 t) (with trailer coach)
- Fuel capacity: .5 long tons (0.51 t; 0.56 short tons)
- Water cap.: 550 imp gal (2,500 L; 660 US gal)
- Firebox
  - Grate area: 8 ft^{2} (0.74 m^{2})
- Boiler: 3 ft 4.5 in (1,029 mm) diameter 2 ft 1.2 in (640 mm) transverse length (each side)
- Boiler pressure: 160 psi (1.10 MPa)
- Heating surface: 338.5 ft^{2} (31.45 m^{2})
- Cylinders: Two, outside
- Cylinder size: 9 in × 14 in (229 mm × 356 mm) (Note: These were also listed at 10 1/2 inches in some sources.)
Career
- Operators: L&YR
- Number in class: 2
- Numbers: L&Y 1-2
- First run: July 1905
- Withdrawn: 1909
- Disposition: All scrapped

The Lancashire and Yorkshire Railway (L&YR) operated two classes of twenty steam railmotors in total.

== Kerr Stuart railmotors ==
The first L&YR railmotors were two by Kerr Stuart, copies of a design that had already been supplied to the Taff Vale Railway. They were ordered by Hughes in 1904.

The locomotive units had transverse boilers of a type similar to the Yorkshire steam wagon, where a single central firebox fed extremely short fire-tubes to a smokebox at each side. Like the Yorkshire, these then returned to a central smokebox and chimney. The outside cylinders were rear-mounted and drove only the leading axle, without coupling rods. The locomotive units were dispatched separately to Newton Heath, where their semi-trailers were attached.

Their coaches were semi-trailers, with reversible seats for 48 passengers and electric lighting. (Note: The L&YR had experimented with electric lighting with steam locomotive dynamos from 1885 and, under the electrically-minded Henry Hoy, with wheel-driven dynamos on coaches from 1901 to 1905. However Aspinall had rejected these as too expensive and electric lighting would not become standard until 1914. Like many railways, this had only been in reaction to the 1913 Ais Gill rail accident.) There were also a luggage compartment and a driving compartment for use in reverse. Folding steps were provided at each of the two doors on each side. They were built by Bristol Wagon & Carriage Works.

Stock list
L&YR No.	Works No.	Delivery Date	Withdrawn
Lot 54
1	904	7 June 1905	1909
2	905	28 June 1905	1909

=== Service ===
Both railmotors worked the Bury-Holcombe Brook line at first. In 1906 they briefly worked at Southport, then between Burnley and Colne for their remaining years. They were both withdrawn in 1909.

== Hughes railmotors ==
L&YR railmotors
Type and origin
- Build date: 1906-1911
- Total produced: 18
Specifications
- Configuration
  - Whyte: 0-4-0T, with semi-trailer
- Driver dia.: 3 ft 7.675 in (1.109 m)
- Length: 69 ft 5 in (21,158 mm); 47 ft 6 in (14,478 mm) (trailer)
- Loco weight: 32 long tons 14 cwt (73,200 lb or 33.2 t) (engine); 47 long tons 10 cwt (106,400 lb or 48.3 t) (with trailer coach)
- Water cap.: 550 imp gal (2,500 L; 660 US gal)
- Firebox
  - Grate area: 9.4 ft^{2} (0.87 m^{2})
- Boiler: 4 ft 3 in (1,295 mm) diameter 5 ft (1,524 mm) length
- Boiler pressure: 180 psi (1.24 MPa)
- Heating surface: 509 ft^{2} (47.3 m^{2})
- Cylinders: Two, outside
- Cylinder size: 12 in × 16 in (305 mm × 406 mm)
Career
- Operators: L&YR; LMS
- Number in class: 18
- Numbers: L&Y 1-18
- Withdrawn: 1927-1948
- Disposition: All scrapped

Hughes designed a further class of railmotors that were then built at Horwich and Newton Heath, in four batches over five years. They were of the "0-4-0T locomotive + semi-trailer type", with conventional locomotive boilers.

No 15, works number 983, was the 1,000th locomotive to be built at Horwich.

=== Service ===
All were inherited by the London, Midland and Scottish Railway (LMS) in 1923, who numbered the locomotives 10600-17 and gave the trailers separate numbers in the coaching stock series. These were the only self-propelled vehicles numbered in the LMS locomotive series rather than the coaching stock series. The first was withdrawn in 1927 and only one, LMS No. 10617, entered British Railways in 1948 and given the internal number 50617, but was withdrawn in March of the same year. None were preserved.

The best-remembered of these railmotors was the 'Altcar Bob' service from Southport to Barton railway station (also known as 'Downholland'), Altcar and Hillhouse (before 1926) and the 'Horwich Jerk' service from Horwich to Blackrod. The latter became the last part of the L&Y System which made use of Hughes Railmotors.

Stock list
L&YR No.	Works No.	Service Date	LMS No.	Withdrawn
Lot 54
3	951	3 May 1906	10600	28 June 1947
4	952	17 May 1906	10601	20 February 1934
5	953	25 May 1906	10602	August 1927
6	954	1 June 1906	10603	May 1927
7	955	7 June 1906	10604	5 October 1929
8	956	22 May 1906	10605	June 1929
Lot 57
9	977	12 January 1907	10606	November 1943
10	978	19 January 1907	10607	27 November 1934
11	979	6 February 1907	10608	November 1935
12	980	16 February 1907	10609	June 1937
13	981	2 March 1907	10610	August 1937
14	982	9 March 1907	10611	October 1931
15	983	23 March 1907	10612	21 December 1934
Lot 63
1	1069	10 December 1909	10613	16 December 1931
2	1070	17 December 1909	10614	June 1937
16	1071	24 December 1909	10615	September 1928
Lot 69
17	1172	December 1911	10616	8 November 1933
18	1173	December 1911	10617	6 March 1948

== See also ==
- Kerr Stuart steam railmotor

== Bibliography ==
- Marshall, John (1972). The Lancashire & Yorkshire Railway. Vol. 3: Locomotives and Rolling Stock. Newton Abbott: David & Charles. ISBN 0-7153-5320-9.
- Essery, Bob; Jenkinson, David (1992). An Illustrated History of LMS Locomotives. Vol. 2: Absorbed Pre-Group Classes Western and Central Divisions. Crecy Publishing. ISBN 9780860932642.
