= Altcar Bob =

The Altcar Bob was the colloquial name for a railmotor train service introduced in July 1906 by the Lancashire and Yorkshire Railway (L&YR) on its Barton Branch, the former Liverpool, Southport and Preston Junction Railway.

The service ran from Southport going through:

- St Luke's,
- Meols Cop,
- Butts Lane Halt, opened in 1909,
- Kew Gardens,
- Heathey Lane Halt, opened in 1907,
- Shirdley Hill,
- New Cut Lane Halt, opened in 1906,
- Halsall,
- Plex Moss Lane Halt, opened in 1906,
- Barton, renamed Downholland in 1924,

and terminated at Altcar and Hillhouse, on the Southport & Cheshire Lines Extension Railway.

The L&YR opened the four 'halts' for this service, they consisted of simple cinder based platforms at track level, passengers accessed the railmotor using folding steps on the vehicle itself. Each halt was lit with an oil-lamp that were so ineffective passengers resorted to striking matches to attract the drivers attention.

It is believed that the Altcar part of the name simply came from the fact that the service terminated at Altcar and Hillhouse. The origin of the term "Bob" is less obvious. Old railwaymen claim that it was named after one of the original drivers, while others insist that this was a common term given to many small locomotives. Another theory is that it relates to the cost of a Southport to Altcar journey in the early days of the service, which was a "bob" being a slang term for a shilling coin.

In 1910 there were 16 weekday return services, of which 6 continued to Altcar and Hillhouse, Saturday had an additional Barton service and Sunday had 9 Barton services one of which continued to Altcar and Hillhouse.

In 1922 there were 11 weekday return services along the line to Barton with 4 of them continuing on to Altcar and Hillhouse, Saturday had an additional 2 Barton services and Sunday had 7 Barton services.

The service was cut-back in 1926, only going as far as Downholland, the new name for Barton station. The service ceased when the line closed to passengers on 26 September 1938.

The railmotor was one of a class of 18 Hughes railmotors, built by the L&YR between 1906 and 1911. They were of the "0-4-0T locomotive + semi-trailer type", with conventional locomotive boilers. When travelling engine-first the driver and fireman were both on the footplate, in the other direction the fireman stayed on the footplate and the drive drove from a compartment at the end of the carriage portion.

== Bibliography ==
- Ashcroft, John (1976). "On the track of Altcar Bob". In Amos, William (ed.). Steam-up in Lancashire: Railwayana from Lancashire Life. Whitethorn Press. pp. 8–13. Archived from the original on 14 February 2006.
- Bradshaw, George (1968) [April 1910]. April 1910 Railway Guide. Newton Abbot: David and Charles. ISBN 978-0-7153-4246-6. OCLC 30645.
- Bradshaw, George (1985) [July 1922]. Bradshaw's General Railway and Steam Navigation guide for Great Britain and Ireland: A reprint of the July 1922 issue. Newton Abbot: David & Charles. ISBN 978-0-7153-8708-5. OCLC 12500436.
- Dyckhoff, Nigel (1999). Portrait of the Cheshire Lines Committee. Shepperton: Ian Allan Publishing. ISBN 0711025215.
- Marshall, John (1972). The Lancashire & Yorkshire Railway. Vol. 3. Newton Abbot: David & Charles. ISBN 978-0-7153-5320-2.
- Marshall, John (1981). North-West England. Forgotten Railways. Vol. 9. David & Charles. ISBN 0-7153-8003-6.
- Suggitt, Gordon (2004) [2003]. Lost Railways of Lancashire (Reprinted from 2003 original with revisions ed.). Newbury: Countryside Books. ISBN 978-1-85306-801-0.
