= Listed buildings in Halsall =

Halsall is a civil parish in the West Lancashire district of Lancashire, England. It contains 17 buildings that are recorded in the National Heritage List for England as designated listed buildings. Of these, one is listed at Grade I, the highest of the three grades, and the others are at Grade II, the lowest grade. The parish contains the villages of Halsall and Shirdley Hill, and is otherwise rural. The Leeds and Liverpool Canal runs through the parish, and the listed buildings associated with it are four bridges and a milestone. The other listed buildings include a church and structures in the churchyard, houses, a ha-ha, a ruined building, a boundary stone, and a war memorial.

== Key ==
Grade	Criteria
I	Buildings of exceptional interest, sometimes considered to be internationally important
II	Buildings of national importance and special interest

== Buildings ==
Name and location	Photograph	Date	Notes	Grade
St Cuthbert's Church; 53.58545°N 2.95245°W		Early 14th century	The oldest part of the church is the chancel, the nave was rebuilt later in the century, and the tower was added in the 15th century. A grammar school was built on the south of the church in 1593. The spire was rebuilt in 1852, and the church was restored in 1873, and further restored in 1886, by Paley and Austin. The church is in sandstone, the chancel roof is in sheet metal, and the other roofs are in stone-slate. The church consists of a west steeple with an embattled projection to the south (the former grammar school), a nave, aisles, a south porch, a chancel, and a north vestry. The steeple has a tower, its lower part is square, it broaches to an octagon, and is surmounted by a spire with lucarnes. On the apex of the gable at the east end of the nave is an octagonal bellcote, and at the junction of the nave and chancel, on both sides, are rood turrets, each with a crocketed spirelet.	I
Ruins of building 53.58606°N 2.94870°W	—	14th century	The ruin is of a building of uncertain type. It is in sandstone, and its walls rise to a maximum of about 5 metres (16 ft). It contains doorways, piers, and parts of window surrounds.	II
Sundial; 53.58528°N 2.95227°W		c. 1700	The sundial is in the churchyard of St Cuthbert's Church. It is in sandstone and has a base on two square steps. The stem is cylindrical with a central swelling, and there is a moulded cornice. On the top is a brass plate and gnomon.	II
Halsall Hall; 53.58372°N 2.95627°W	—	Early 18th century (probable)	The building, whose original use is uncertain, has been converted into cottages. It is in brick on a stone plinth with sandstone dressings. The building has two storeys with attics, and a front of ten bays. The central two bays are pedimented and contain a Venetian-style attic window. The windows in the upper floor are sashes, and those in the ground floor and at the rear are mullioned. The windows have Tudor arched heads.	II
Harker's Bridge; 53.57111°N 2.95651°W		1774	This is bridge No. 23, and it carries Plex Lane over the Leeds and Liverpool Canal. The bridge is in sandstone and consists of a single elliptical arch. It has a solid parapet with coping.	II
Hill Bridge; 53.57668°N 2.95166°W		1774	This is bridge No. 24, an accommodation bridge over the Leeds and Liverpool Canal. The bridge is in sandstone and consists of a single elliptical arch. It has a solid parapet with coping.	II
Bridge No. 26; 53.58906°N 2.94006°W		1774	Bridge No. 26 carries North Moor Lane over the Leeds and Liverpool Canal. The bridge is in sandstone and consists of a single elliptical arch. It has a solid parapet with coping.	II
Weaver's Bridge; 53.59254°N 2.93587°W		1774	This is bridge No. 27, and it carries Morris Lane over the Leeds and Liverpool Canal. The bridge is in sandstone and consists of a single elliptical arch. It has a solid parapet with coping.	II
58 New Street; 53.58221°N 2.95639°W	—	Early 19th century	The house is in brick with a slate roof, and has two storeys and three bays. The windows are sashes with stone sills and lintels. In the centre is a doorway with Tuscan pilasters, an open pediment, and a fanlight.	II
3A Summerwood Lane; 53.58529°N 2.95138°W	—	Early 19th century	A brick house with a slate roof, in two storeys and with a symmetrical front of three bays. The windows are sashes, with stone sills and lintels. The central doorway has a stone doorcase with pilasters, a fanlight, and an open pediment.	II
Boundary stone 53.59236°N 2.93118°W	—	Early 19th century	The boundary stone is in sandstone and has a wedge-shaped plan. Its faces are inscribed "Halsall" and "Scarisbrick".	II
La Mancha; 53.60677°N 2.95910°W	—	Early to mid 19th century	A brick house on a sandstone plinth, with a cornice and a slate roof. There are two storeys, and a front of five unequal bays. The windows are casements with brick hood moulds. The doorway has engaged fluted columns, a segmental fanlight, and a cornice.	II
Old font 53.58528°N 2.95241°W		Early to mid 19th century	The font is in the churchyard of St Cuthbert's Church. It is in sandstone and has an octagonal plan with a narrow stem decorated with blind tracery. Each side of the bowl has two panels containing a carved shield.	II
Halsall House; 53.58773°N 2.94796°W	—	1844–45	The house, designed by Sydney Smirke, is in sandstone with a slate roof, and is in Jacobean style. It has two storeys with cellars and attics, and has an irregular plan. The entrance front is symmetrical, and has a five bay central section loggia and short gabled wings at the sides. The central doorway has a Perpendicular arch, and on the front some of the windows are mullioned and transomed, and others are cross windows. The south front has two gabled bays and French windows, and at the southeast corner is a turret that has an ogival cap with a weathervane. On the north side are service extensions and a 20th-century conservatory.	II
Ha-ha, Halsall House; 53.58741°N 2.94932°W	—	c. 1850	The ha-ha is in sandstone and runs parallel to the three main faces of the house, and about 50 metres (160 ft) away from it. It is about 1 metre (3 ft 3 in) deep, and two later bridges have been built across it.	II
Milestone; 53.57297°N 2.95498°W	—	19th century	The milestone is by the towpath of the Leeds and Liverpool Canal. It is in cast iron and has a triangular plan. Its sides are inscribed with the distances in miles to Liverpool and Leeds.	II
War memorial 53.58508°N 2.95330°W		c.1920	The war memorial incorporates a cross base probably from the 15th century. The cross base is in sandstone and the rest of the memorial is in limestone. The base has a square plan chamfered to an octagon, and it stands on four octagonal steps. The tapering shaft is also octagonal, and the head is gabled with a carving of the Crucifixion. On the second step is an inscription, including the names of those who were lost.	II
