= Plex Moss Lane Halt railway station =

Former railway station in England

Plex Moss Lane Halt
- The "Altcar Bob" at Plex Moss Lane Halt circa 1907

General information
- Location: West Lancashire; England
- Coordinates: 53.5775°N 2.9694°W
- Platforms: 2

Other information
- Status: Disused

History
- Original company: Liverpool, Southport and Preston Junction Railway
- Pre-grouping: Lancashire and Yorkshire Railway
- Post-grouping: London, Midland and Scottish

Key dates
- July 1906: Halt opened
- 26 September 1938: Halt closed to passengers
- 21 January 1952: Closed completely
Location

Plex Moss Lane Halt was a railway station between Halsall and Barton in Lancashire. The station opened in July 1906 as a halt on the Liverpool, Southport and Preston Junction Railway, and consisted of simple cinder based platforms at track level which required steps to be lowered from the coach for passenger access. It was situated to the south of the road bridge on Plex Moss Lane, to which it was connected by wooden steps. The station closed to passengers on 26 September 1938 and the tracks were lifted shortly after the line closed in 1952.

In 2015 the bridge and trackbed were plainly visible, the latter as a wide band of mature trees.

Preceding station	Disused railways	Following station
Halsall	Liverpool, Southport and Preston Junction Railway; Barton Branch	Barton
