= Meols Cop railway station =

Railway station in North-West England

Coordinates: 53.646°N 2.975°W

Meols Cop
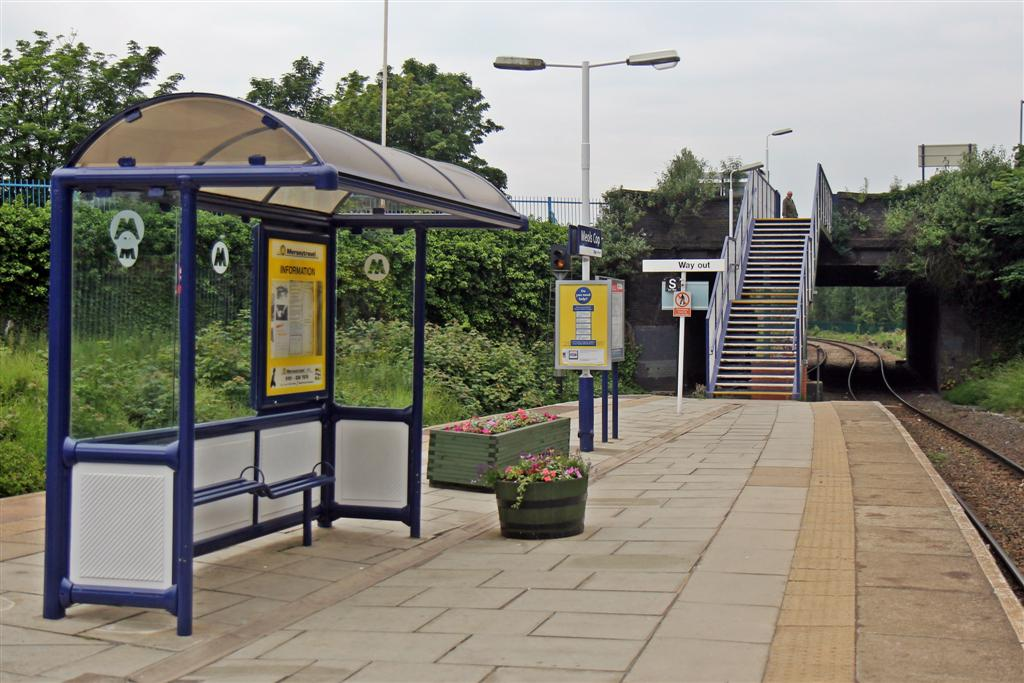
- On platform 1, looking over at platform 2 in 2012

General information
- Location: Blowick, Sefton; England
- Grid reference: SD356170
- Manager: Northern Trains
- Transit authority: Merseytravel
- Platforms: 2

Other information
- Station code: MEC
- Fare zone: D1
- Classification: DfT category F2

History
- Original company: Liverpool, Southport and Preston Junction Railway
- Pre-grouping: Lancashire and Yorkshire Railway
- Post-grouping: London Midland and Scottish Railway

Key dates
- 1 November 1887: Opened
- 1909: Electrified
- 1970: De-electrified

Passengers
- 2020/21: ▼22,176
- 2021/22: ▲63,936
- 2022/23: ▲85,448
- 2023/24: ▼82,292
- 2024/25: ▼78,640
Location
Notes
- Passenger statistics from the Office of Rail and Road

Meols Cop railway station serves the Blowick suburb of the coastal town of Southport, Merseyside, England. The station has an island platform and is served by Northern Trains‘ Manchester Victoria/Manchester Piccadilly - Southport via Wigan Wallgate branch services, on which it is the last stop before the terminus.

Until 2026, Meols Cop was the only station within the Merseyside travel area that was without a Railway Totem, on a pole until July when two were installed on the approaches outside the station.

== History ==
Meols Cop railway station opened on 1 November 1887, originally as part of the Liverpool, Southport and Preston Junction Railway from Southport Central to Altcar and Hillhouse. It is the only part of that line still in use, having replaced a section of the Manchester and Southport Railway. The LP&SJR struggled financially from opening and was absorbed by the Lancashire and Yorkshire Railway in July 1897. Within four years, the new owners of the line had diverted services to their established terminus at Chapel Street along with those of the West Lancashire Railway from Preston, with Central being relegated to use as a goods depot.

The line through Meols Cop was electrified in February 1909 by the L&YR to exploit the area's potential for commuter traffic, with the popular electric service between Southport and Crossens being diverted there over the north to east side of the triangular junction with WLR, which was sited immediately to the west. Services then reversed at the station before continuing to either Southport or Churchtown & Crossens. The L&Y subsequently opened a carriage maintenance depot within the triangle nearby to maintain their new Electric Multiple Unit fleet in 1912.

In February 1911 a connection from the LS&PJR route to join the Wigan line at Pool Hey Junction was opened, which allowed trains from Wigan (and Ormskirk) to Southport to serve the station - this would later allow the closure of the original M&SR route via Blowick and the removal of the busy level crossing there. For much of the station's life though, its train service was provided mainly by the Crossens to Southport EMUs (a few of which continued through to/from Liverpool Exchange) and the Southport to Altcar trains, which from 1906 were provided by steam railmotors.

By 1926, the Altcar Bob service had been cut back to Barton and it was subsequently withdrawn completely by the London, Midland and Scottish Railway in September 1938. Goods traffic continued over the line until complete closure in January 1952.

The third rail was only used for access to the carriage works after the September 1964 closure of the Southport-Crossens service, which became a victim of the Beeching Axe (along with the WLR main line) despite being used by over 2 million passenger per year. This left the station with a much reduced service to Southport & Wigan, which initially was only provided at morning & evening peak periods. From 14 June 1965, all trains on the Wigan route were routed through the station with the closure of the Blowick line, but it was not until the spring 1967 timetable change that off-peak calls were reinstated. The Wigan to Southport line had not been recommended for closure by Beeching in his 1963 report, but British Rail subsequently submitted a closure proposal for the route and Meols Cop station in May 1967. This was eventually rejected by the Minister for Transport exactly a year later, securing the station's future. Goods traffic however ceased to be handled in November 1967, with the closure of the goods yard.

The Meols Cop Electric depot closed on 14 February 1970, and the third rail was lifted shortly afterwards. The station remained well served though, with over 20 trains calling in each direction in the May 1975 timetable and this frequency remained more or less unchanged for the next two decades. Sunday services however ceased in the mid 1980s and the station became unstaffed in 1990, subsequently losing its wooden buildings to demolition in March 2000 (replacement 'bus stop' style shelters being erected the following month). However, Sunday services have resumed.

In early January 2016, CCTV cameras were installed at the station. In November 2025, footings for new Passenger information system (PIDS) where installed, with the new system coming online in early December.

== Facilities ==
This station is unstaffed and only accessible via stairs. There is no disabled access at this station.

The station is equipped with Dot-matrix display departure and arrival screens on the platform for passenger information. A self-service ticket machine has been installed on the island platform. Passengers must purchase tickets from this machine using a debit or credit card before boarding a train. Passengers wishing to pay by cash must use the ticket machine to gain a Promise to Pay notice for their journey so that they can pay the fare with the on board conductor or at the destination station.

This route has penalty fares in operation so failure to produce a valid ticket or Promise to Pay notice can result in you paying twice the amount of the original fare or Twenty Pounds (whichever is greater).

== Services ==
There is a half hourly service in each direction to Southport and both Manchester stations on weekdays & Saturdays (alternately to Victoria and Manchester Oxford Road). Most services continue beyond Victoria to Stalybridge, though the last eastbound train terminates at Wigan. Passengers for stations on the Atherton line need to change at Wigan, whilst those for Manchester Piccadilly and points south or east must change at Oxford Road.

The station was closed on Sundays up until the December 2008 timetable change, but is now served hourly in each direction (eastbound to Blackburn via Victoria and Todmorden).

Sundays see Meols Cop served by one train per hour to Manchester Victoria via Walkden and one train per hour to Southport. Passengers for Westhoughton and Bolton need to change at Hindley.

== Community ==
The station is voluntarily maintained by the Friends of Meols Cop Station group. The group looks after the station by tending the gardens and keeping the station clean and tidy.

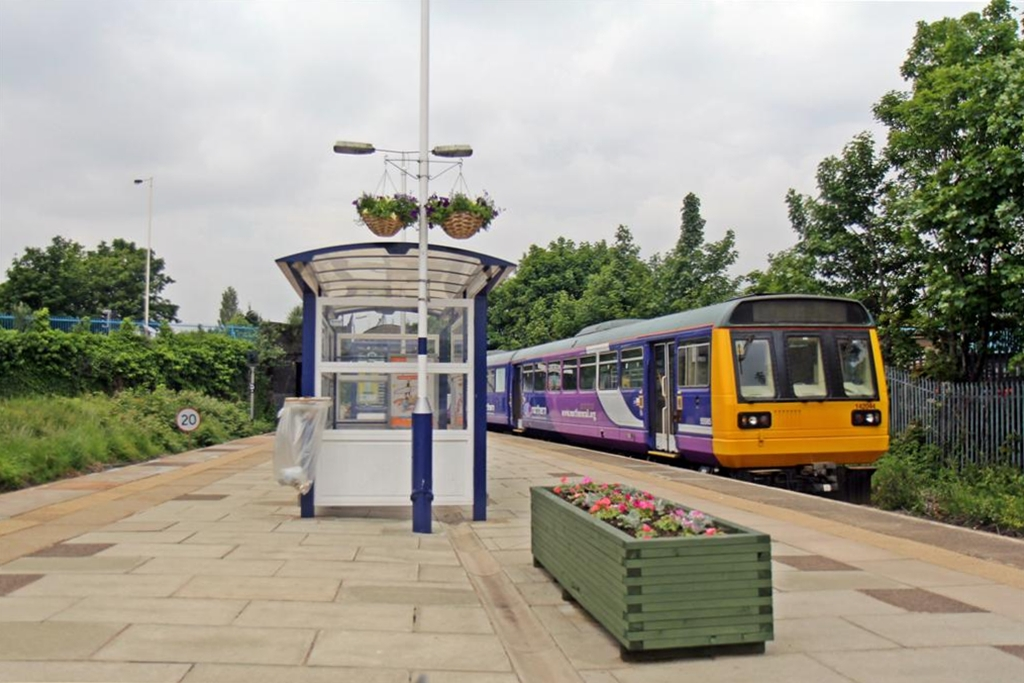
A well-maintained platform.

| Preceding station | National Rail | Following station |
|---|---|---|
| Southport | Northern Trains; Manchester Victoria-Southport or Manchester Oxford Rd-Southport | Bescar Lane or Burscough Bridge |
| | Disused railways | |
| Southport Ash Street until 1902; Line and station closed | Lancashire and Yorkshire Railway; Liverpool, Southport and Preston Junction Railway | Kew Gardens until 1907; Line and station closed |
| St Luke's from 1902; Line open, station closed | Lancashire and Yorkshire Railway; Liverpool, Southport and Preston Junction Railway | Butts Lane Halt from 1907; Line open, station closed |
| Hesketh Park; Line and station closed | Lancashire and Yorkshire Railway; Southport-Crossens electric service | Trains reverse |
| St Luke's; Line open, station closed | Lancashire and Yorkshire Railway; Southport-Crossens electric service | Trains reverse |
