= Shirdley Hill railway station =

Former railway station in England

Shirdley Hill
- Looking south to the remains of Shirdley Hill railway station in 1949

General information
- Location: Shirdley Hill, West Lancashire; England
- Coordinates: 53.6074°N 2.9689°W
- Grid reference: SD359127
- Platforms: 2

Other information
- Status: Disused

History
- Original company: Liverpool, Southport and Preston Junction Railway
- Pre-grouping: Lancashire and Yorkshire Railway; London and North Western Railway
- Post-grouping: London, Midland and Scottish Railway

Key dates
- 1 November 1887: Opened
- 26 September 1938: Closed (regular services)
- 1952: Closed (all services)
Location

Shirdley Hill was a railway station in the village of Shirdley Hill, Lancashire, on the Liverpool, Southport and Preston Junction Railway. Situated on Renacres Lane, the station opened on 1 November 1887 and was the only station on the Barton Branch to have a level crossing instead of a road bridge. The "Altcar Bob" service operated through Shirdley Hill from July 1906.

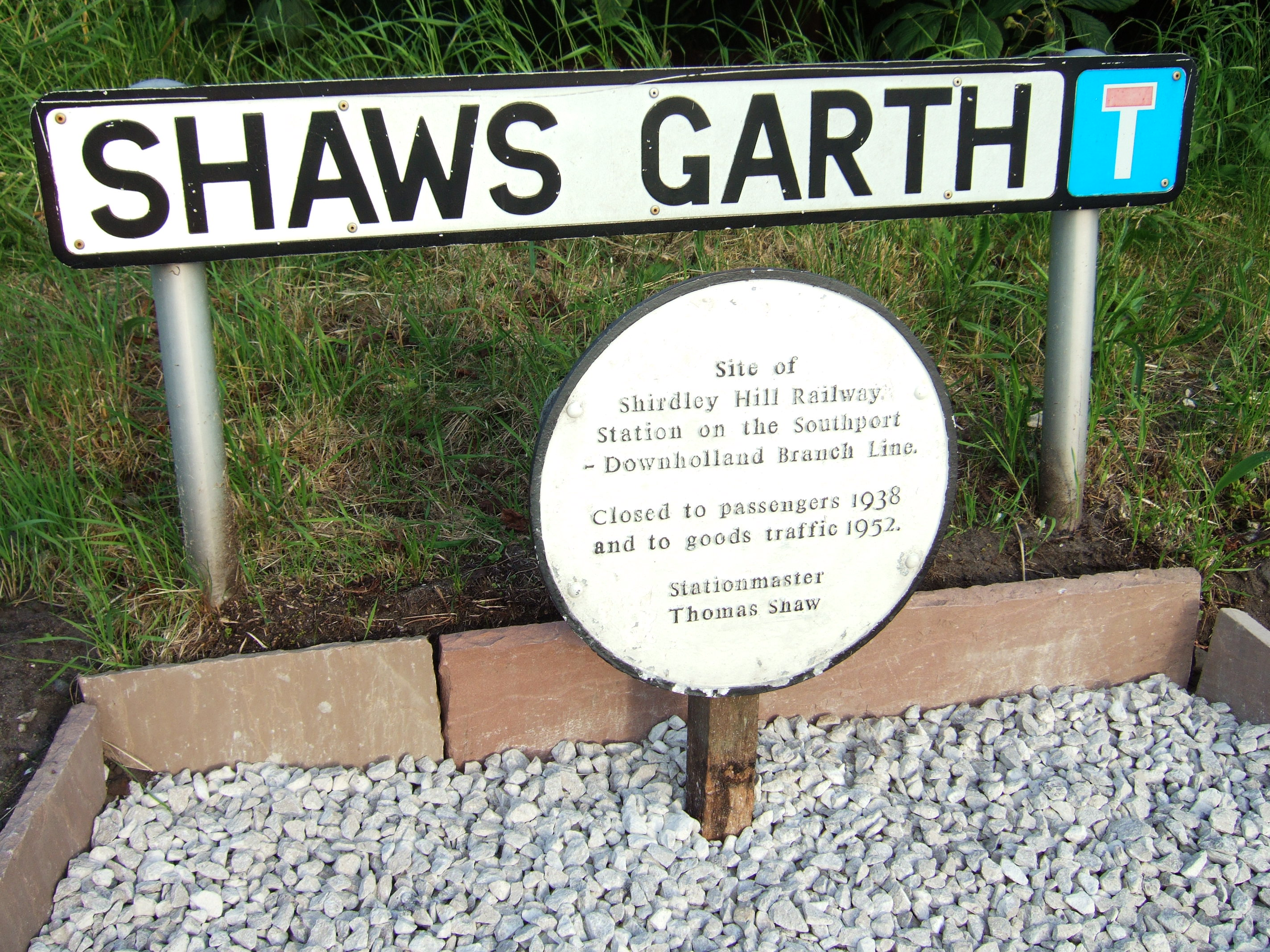
A plaque on the corner of Shaws Garth, marking the site of the station.

The station closed to passengers on 26 September 1938, though the line remained open for goods traffic until 21 January 1952. Tracks from Butts Lane Halt to Shirdley Hill were left in place until 1964 for the storage of excursion coaches.

Nothing remains of the station, with the site now occupied by a road named Shaws Garth, just off Renacres Lane. The road is named in memory of the last stationmaster, Thomas Shaw, and a plaque marks the location of the station. The plaque reads:

Site of Shirdley Hill Railway Station on the Southport-Downholland Branch Line. Closed to passengers 1938 and to goods traffic 1952. Stationmaster Thomas Shaw.

Preceding station	Disused railways	Following station
Kew Gardens until 1907	Liverpool, Southport and Preston Junction Railway; Barton Branch	Halsall until 1906
Heathey Lane Halt from 1907	Liverpool, Southport and Preston Junction Railway; Barton Branch	New Cut Lane Halt from 1906
