= New Cut Lane Halt railway station =

Former railway station in England

New Cut Lane Halt

General information
- Location: West Lancashire; England
- Coordinates: 53.5966°N 2.9667°W
- Platforms: 2

Other information
- Status: Disused

History
- Original company: Lancashire and Yorkshire Railway
- Pre-grouping: Lancashire and Yorkshire Railway
- Post-grouping: London, Midland and Scottish

Key dates
- July 1906: Halt opened
- 26 September 1938: Halt closed to passengers
- 21 January 1952: Line closed completely
Location

New Cut Lane Halt was a railway station between Shirdley Hill and Halsall in Lancashire. The station opened in July 1906 as a halt on the Liverpool, Southport and Preston Junction Railway, and consisted of simple cinder based platforms at track level. It was situated to the south of the roadbridge on New Cut Lane, to which it was connected by wooden steps. The station closed to passengers on 26 September 1938 and the tracks were lifted shortly after the line closed in 1952.

Preceding station	Disused railways	Following station
Shirdley Hill	Liverpool, Southport and Preston Junction Railway; Barton Branch	Halsall
