= Kew Gardens (disambiguation) =

Kew Gardens is a botanical garden in London, England, managed by the Royal Botanic Gardens, Kew.

Kew Gardens may also refer to:

== Places ==
- Kew Gardens (Toronto) in the Beaches neighbourhood of Toronto, Ontario, Canada
- Kew Gardens, Queens, the name of a neighborhood in the borough of Queens in New York City, US
- Kew Gardens, former public park in Kew, Merseyside

== Art, entertainment, and media ==
- "Kew Gardens" (short story), a short story by Virginia Woolf

== Transport ==
- Kew Gardens station (LIRR), a Long Island Railroad station
- Kew Gardens station (London) in zones 3 & 4 of the London Underground in England
- Kew Gardens railway station (Merseyside), a former station in Southport, England
- Kew Gardens Interchange, a road interchange in Queens, New York
- Kew Gardens–Union Turnpike station, a New York City Subway station on the IND Queens Boulevard Line

== Other ==
- Kew Gardens (horse), Thoroughbred racehorse, winner of the 2018 St Leger
