= Kew Gardens railway station (Merseyside) =

Disused railway station in England

Kew Gardens
- Kew Gardens railway station circa 1930, looking north towards Southport

General information
- Location: Southport, Sefton; England
- Coordinates: 53.6329°N 2.9687°W
- Grid reference: SD359156
- Platforms: 2

Other information
- Status: Disused

History
- Original company: Liverpool, Southport and Preston Junction Railway
- Pre-grouping: Lancashire and Yorkshire Railway
- Post-grouping: London, Midland and Scottish

Key dates
- 2 September 1887: Opened
- 26 September 1938: Closed to passengers
- 7 July 1952: Closed completely
Location

Kew Gardens was a railway station at Kew, a suburb of Southport in what was then Lancashire.

== History ==
The line and station were built by the Liverpool, Southport and Preston Junction Railway, opening on 2 September 1887.

Kew Gardens served and was named after a nearby 12-acre (49,000 m^{2}) park and boating lake, which closed around 1930.

The station was located on a railway embankment to the north of Scarisbrick Road (now Southport Road, the A570) where the line crossed the road on an over-bridge. The station had two timber platforms each accessed by a sloping path coming up from road level, there was a wooden building on each platform. There was a small goods yard with three sidings to the south of the road over-bridge on the west side of the running lines able to accommodate most types of goods including live stock.

Initially there were six trains daily, with three on Sundays, by 1897 this had been reduced to four and at this time the Lancashire and Yorkshire Railway (L&YR) absorbed the line.

Under L&YR ownership the line was known also as the Barton branch and was notable for the railmotor "Altcar Bob" service, introduced in July 1906, by 1910 the service operated 16 daily return trips between Southport and Barton with some of them continuing to Altcar and Hillhouse on the Southport and Cheshire Lines Extension Railway (SCLER), through services to the SCLER ceased in 1926.

The station closed to passengers on 26 September 1938. The station and the line closed to goods traffic on 7 July 1952 with only the section between Blowick and Shirdley Hill remaining in use to store excursion stock until it closed in 1964.

The site has since been redeveloped and is now occupied by a retail park.

Preceding station	Disused railways	Following station
Meols Cop until 1907	Lancashire and Yorkshire Railway (former Liverpool, Southport and Preston Junction Railway); Barton Branch	Shirdley Hill until 1907
Butts Lane Halt from 1907	Lancashire and Yorkshire Railway (former Liverpool, Southport and Preston Junction Railway); Barton Branch	Heathey Lane Halt from 1907

== Bibliography ==
- Gell, Rob (1985). An illustrated survey of Liverpool's railway stations, 1830-1985. Crosby, England: Heyday Pub. ISBN 978-0-947562-03-8. OCLC 655445796. Book is alphabetical without page numbers.
- Marshall, John (1969). The Lancashire & Yorkshire Railway. Vol. 1. Newton Abbot: David & Charles. ISBN 978-0-7153-4352-4.
- Marshall, John (1981). North-West England. Forgotten Railways. Vol. 9. David & Charles. ISBN 0-7153-8003-6.
- Mayer, Philip; Openshaw, George (1989). Southport : a portrait in old picture postcards. S.B. Publications. OCLC 1392111821.
- Quick, Michael (2023) [2001]. Railway passenger stations in Great Britain: a chronology (PDF). version 5.05. Railway & Canal Historical Society.
- Suggitt, Gordon (2004) [2003]. Lost Railways of Lancashire (Reprinted from 2003 original with revisions ed.). Newbury: Countryside Books. ISBN 978-1-85306-801-0.
- The Railway Clearing House (1970) [1904]. The Railway Clearing House Handbook of Railway Stations 1904 (1970 D&C Reprint ed.). Newton Abbot: David & Charles Reprints. ISBN 0-7153-5120-6.
