= Kew (personal name) =

Kew is primarily known as the London district which contains Kew Gardens, but it can also be a surname and a given name. People with this name include:

== Surname ==
- Alex Kew (born 1986), English actor, musician, and singer-songwriter
- Gordon Kew (1930–2018), English football referee
- Harry Wallis Kew (1868–1948), English amateur zoologist
- Henry Ah Kew (1900–1966), New Zealand lawyer and community leader
- Kew Siang Tong (born ?), Malaysian gastroenterologist, academic administrator, and health bureaucrat

== Given name ==
- Kew Jaliens (born 1978), Dutch footballer
- Kew Nordqvist (born 1950), Swedish politician
- Kim Seung-kew (born 1944), South Korean politician, lawyer, and jurist
- Lai Kew Chai (1941–2006), Malaysia-born Singaporean supreme court judge
- Tan Yee Kew (born 1953), Malaysian politician
- Teh Kew San (born 1934), Malaysian badminton player
- Wat Ngong (also known as Kew-a-gong, Kew-Agang, or Kew A-gang; 1785–1867), Chinese Protestant convert, evangelist, writer, and lithographer
- Wong Kew-Lit (born 1971), Malaysian film director and producer

== See also ==
- Kew (disambiguation)
- McKew (disambiguation), a similar surname
- St Kew, a Cornish village and namesake of Cywa (Kew), a Welsh saint and the founder of a monastery in the area of St Kew
