= Southport (disambiguation) =

Southport is a seaside town in Merseyside, England.

Southport or South Port may also refer to:

== Australia ==
- Southport, Queensland, a Gold Coast suburb
- Town of Southport, a former local government area in Queensland
- Electoral district of Southport, Queensland, Australia
- Southport, Northern Territory, a suburb of Darwin
- Southport Island, Tasmania
- Southport, Tasmania

== Canada ==
- Southport, Newfoundland and Labrador
- Portage la Prairie/Southport Airport

== China ==
- South Port, Hainan

== New Zealand ==
- Port Pegasus / Pikihatiti, formerly South Port, a site on Stewart Island, New Zealand
- South Port (New Zealand), a bay off Taiari / Chalky Inlet

== South Africa ==
- Southport, KwaZulu-Natal, a small coastal village on the South Coast of KwaZulu-Natal

== United Kingdom ==
- Southport (UK Parliament constituency)

== United States ==
- Southport, Connecticut, a section of Fairfield, Connecticut
  - Southport Historic District (Fairfield, Connecticut)
- Southport, Florida
- Southport, Indiana, a city in Marion County
- Southport, Owen County, Indiana, an unincorporated community
- Southport, Maine
- Southport, New York, a town
  - Southport (CDP), New York, a census-designated place in the town
  - Southport Correctional Facility
- Southport, North Carolina
- Southport, Oregon
- Southport (Renton, Washington), a mixed-use development
- Kenosha, Wisconsin, formerly Southport

== See also ==
- 2024 Southport stabbing, a mass stabbing event
- Southport station (disambiguation)
