= Kew, Merseyside =

Coordinates: 53.630°N 2.978°W

Kew
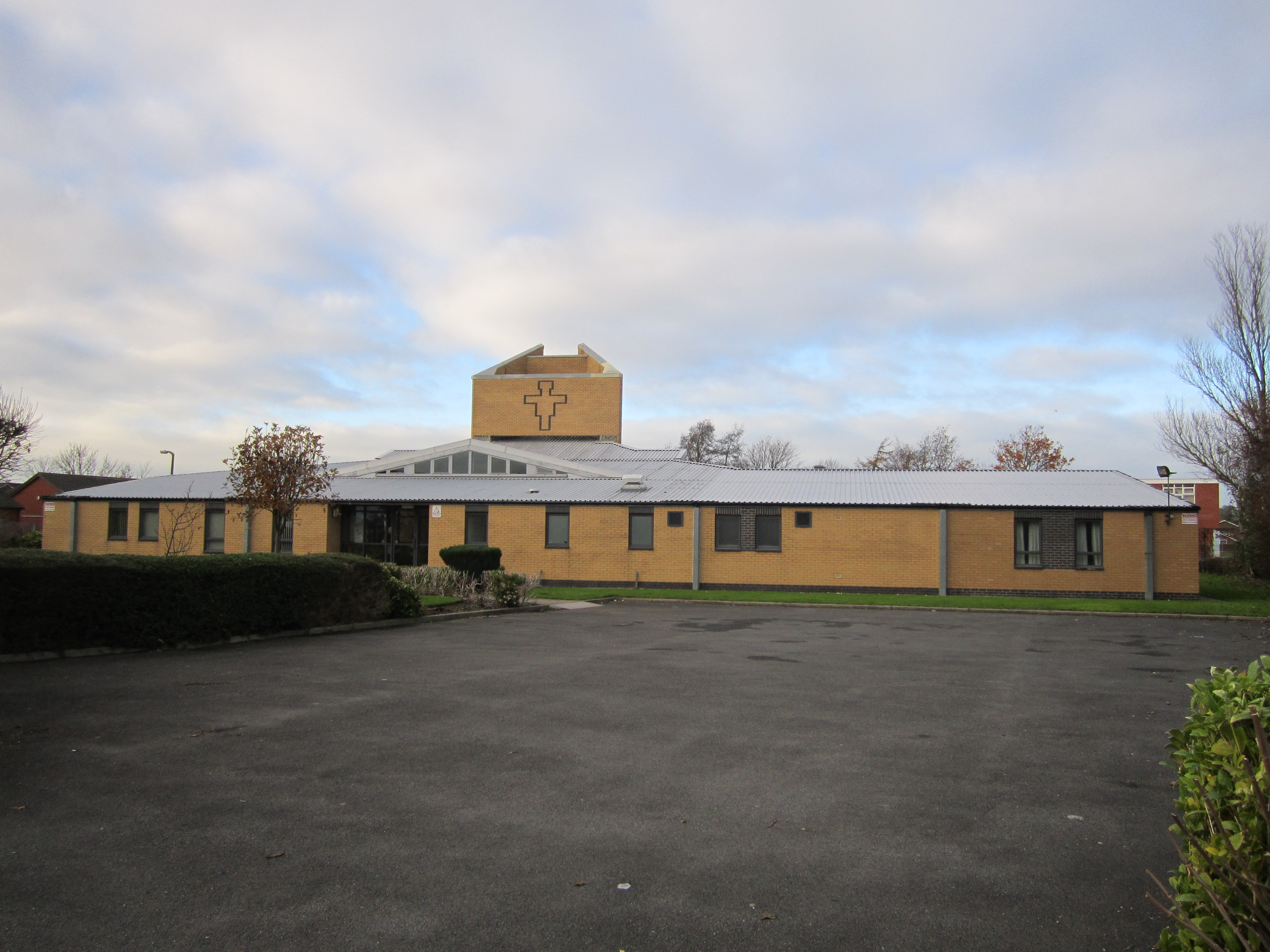
- Church of St. Francis of Assisi

- Location in Southport Location within Merseyside
- Metropolitan borough: Sefton
- Metropolitan county: Merseyside
- Region: North West
- Country: England
- Sovereign state: United Kingdom
- Post town: SOUTHPORT
- Postcode district: PR8
- Dialling code: 01704
- Police: Merseyside
- Fire: Merseyside
- Ambulance: North West
- UK Parliament: Southport

Kew is a suburb and ward of Southport, a seaside town in Sefton, Merseyside, England. It makes up the southeastern edge of the town, bordering Scarisbrick in West Lancashire. It is a middle class area of mostly modern development, and one of Southport's smallest suburbs.

== History ==
Kew Gardens was a 12 acres (4.9 ha) garden and zoological site that opened in the 1860s as Alexandra Gardens. The grounds included a variety theatre, extensive tea and other refreshment rooms, large conservatories, ornamental plant and fruit houses and a pavilion. There was a 2 acres (0.81 ha) lake used for boating and skating 'tastefully diversified' with bridges and islands. A zoo, or menagerie, was added in the 1870s.

There were illuminated carnivals on the lake and large parties (up to 1,000 a day) could be catered for in the dining and dancing pavilion and entertained in the variety theatre.

The Birkdale and Southport Tramways Company, introduced horse trams on 12 May 1883 from Kew Gardens to London Square, later extended to the Crown Hotel in Birkdale. In April 1914 the tram company introduced a 'Grand Tour' service operated by toastrack trams. It ran from London Square to Kew Gardens and back to the centre via St. Lukes Road.

The tram service ceased in 1916 and the Gardens became run down, closing at an unkown date. They reopened in 1928, but finally closed in the early 1930s. The Richmond Hotel and Kew Woods are all that now remain.

Kew was served by Kew Gardens railway station on the Liverpool, Southport and Preston Junction Railway from 2 September 1887 to 26 September 1938.

== Modern Kew ==
Modern-day Kew is a mid-late 20th century housing estate close to the Hospital which was built on Blowick Moss and also former playing fields. The roads on the first development are mainly named after horse racing venues and was started around 1974, the next part started soon after by Brosley homes. A third development started around 2014 and now almost finished 2024.

=== Local amenities ===
The area is served by a number of 'out of town' shopping complexes, Kew retail park, and the Meols Cop retail park (not in Kew, but Blowick) and a large Tesco.There is also a number of pubs, including Hickory's Smokehouse, The Richmond and The Old Duke. There is a primary school, Kew Woods, the towns main Hospital and Queenscourt Hospice. A Church dedicated to St Francis of Assisi can also be found in Kew.

=== Transport ===
The nearest station is Meols Cop on the Manchester to Southport line. Kew is also served by buses to Liverpool and Ormskirk.

== Bibliography ==
- Gillham, John C. (2003). The tramways of South Lancashire and North Wales. Broxbourne: Light Rail Transit Association.
- Mayer, Philip; Openshaw, George (1989). Southport : a portrait in old picture postcards. S.B. Publications. OCLC 1392111821.
- Quick, Michael (2023) [2001]. Railway passenger stations in Great Britain: a chronology (PDF). version 5.05. Railway & Canal Historical Society.
- Tarbuck, Joan (1972). Southport as it was. Hendon Publishing.
- Wright, Geoff (1992). Southport : a century ago. Blackpool: Landy.
