= Shirdley Hill =

Village in Lancashire, England

Coordinates: 53.608°N 2.968°W

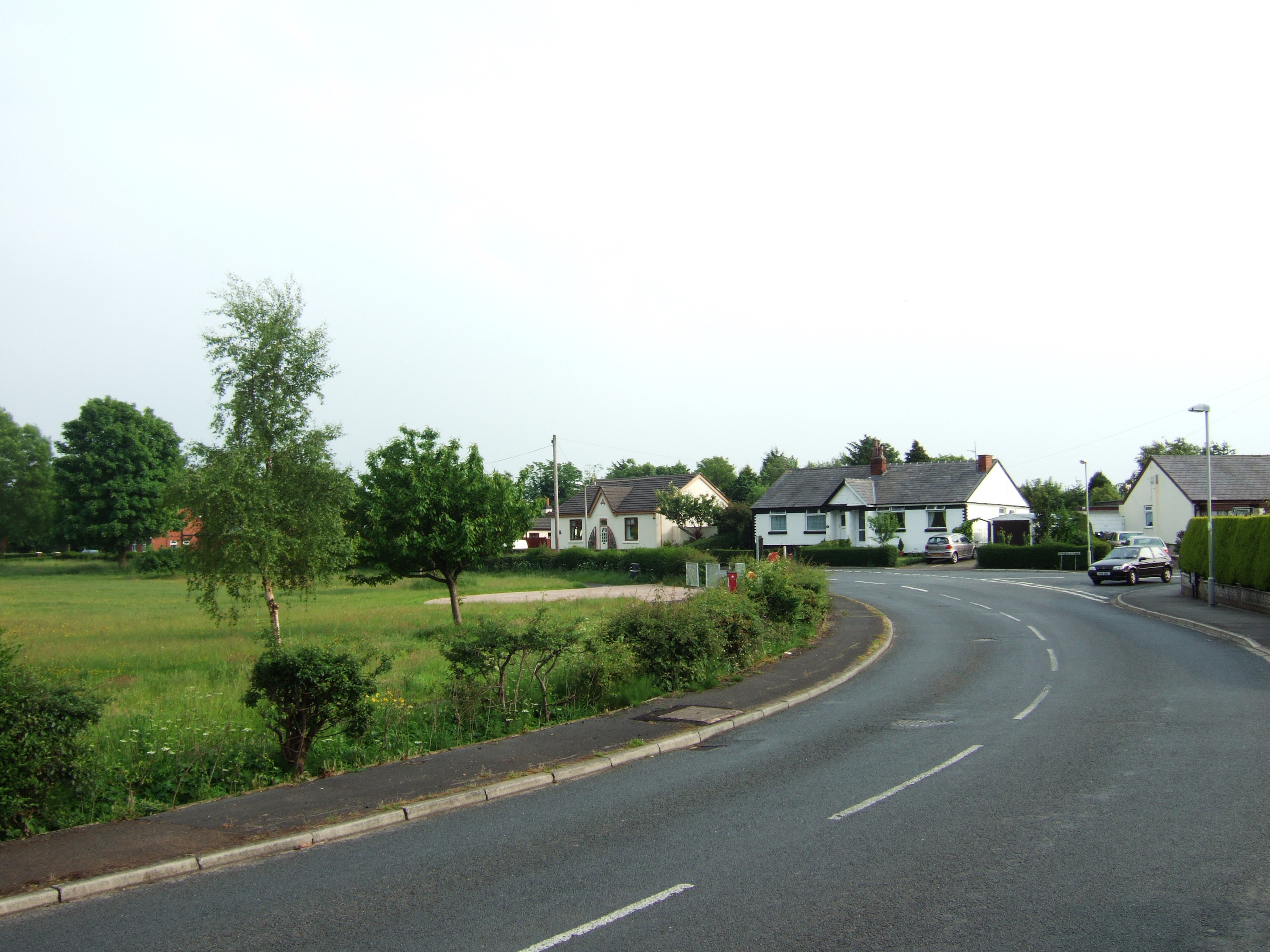
- Shirdley Hill

- Location in West Lancashire Location within Lancashire
- OS grid reference: SD359128
- Civil parish: Halsall
- District: West Lancashire
- Shire county: Lancashire
- Region: North West
- Country: England
- Sovereign state: United Kingdom
- Post town: ORMSKIRK
- Postcode district: L39
- Dialling code: 01704
- Police: Lancashire
- Fire: Lancashire
- Ambulance: North West
- UK Parliament: West Lancashire

Shirdley Hill is a small village in the civil parish of Halsall, Lancashire, England, and is situated on the West Lancashire Coastal Plain. It is reached by B roads from either the A5147 or the A570.

An £80,000 redevelopment of the village green, completed in 2009, provided the green with a new pond, benches and a flower bed. Shirdley Hill railway station was on the Liverpool, Southport and Preston Junction Railway, though the station closed in 1938, and the track was lifted in 1964. A plaque on the corner of Shaws Garth marks the site.

In 2013, the Village installed an Automated Defibrillator near the Bus Stop.

Shirdley Hill gave its name to "Shirdley Hill Sand" which was used in a number of industrial processes, particularly glassmaking.
