= Halsall railway station =

Former railway station in England

Halsall
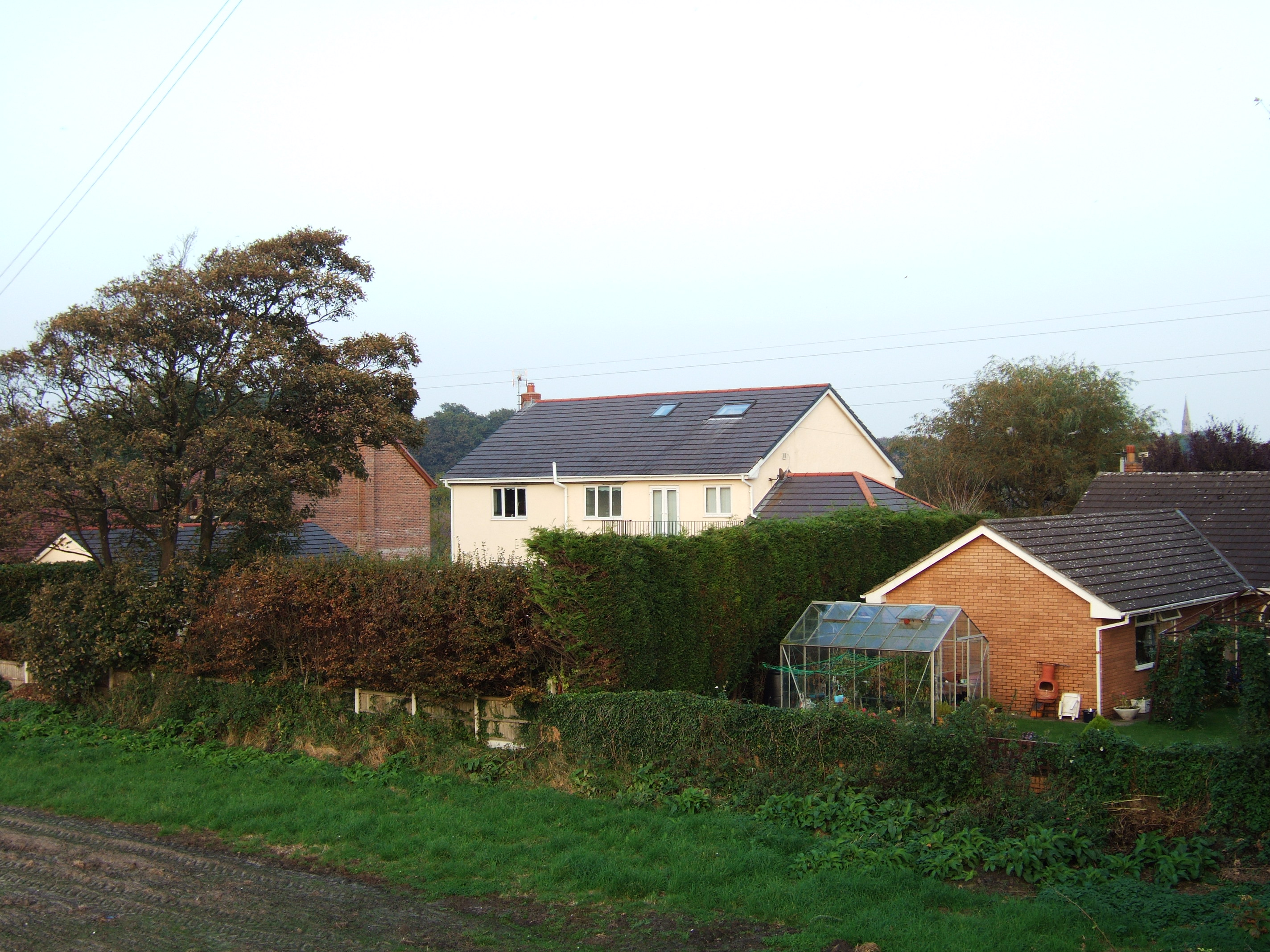
- The site of Halsall railway station in 2007. The white house in the centre, now a private residence, is the old station building. The track ran parallel to the edge of the field

General information
- Location: Halsall, West Lancashire; England
- Coordinates: 53.5844°N 2.9646°W
- Platforms: 2

Other information
- Status: Disused

History
- Original company: Liverpool, Southport and Preston Junction Railway
- Pre-grouping: Lancashire and Yorkshire Railway
- Post-grouping: London, Midland and Scottish

Key dates
- 1 November 1887: Opened
- 26 September 1938: closed for passenger services
- 21 January 1952: closed completely
Location

Halsall railway station was a railway station in the village of Halsall, Lancashire, on the Liverpool, Southport and Preston Junction Railway. Situated north of Carr Moss Lane, it opened on 1 November 1887 and closed on 26 September 1938. The tracks were lifted shortly after the line closed in 1952, though the station building survives as a private residence. The "Altcar Bob" service once operated through this station.

Preceding station	Disused railways	Following station
Shirdley Hill until 1906	Liverpool, Southport and Preston Junction Railway; Barton Branch	Barton until 1906
New Cut Lane Halt from 1906	Liverpool, Southport and Preston Junction Railway; Barton Branch	Plex Moss Lane Halt from 1906
