= St Cuthbert's Church, Halsall =

Coordinates: 53.5854°N 2.9523°W

St Cuthbert's, Halsall
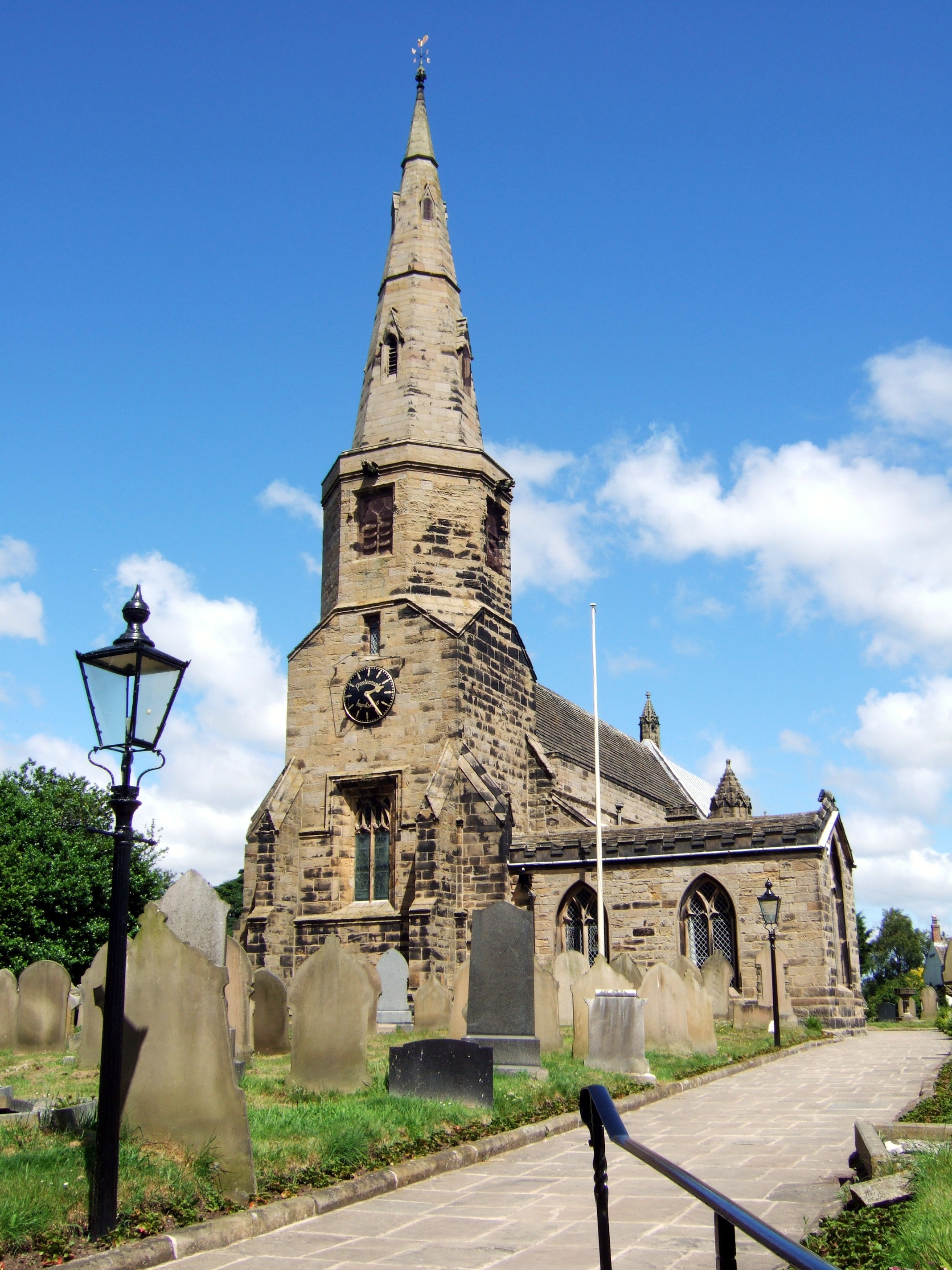

- Location in West Lancashire
- OS grid reference: SD 37055 10292
- Location: Halsall, Lancashire
- Country: England
- Denomination: Anglican

History
- Status: Parish church

Architecture
- Functional status: Active
- Heritage designation: Grade I

Specifications
- Materials: Sandstone

Administration
- Province: York
- Diocese: Liverpool
- Archdeaconry: Warrington
- Deanery: Ormskirk

St Cuthbert's Church is an Anglican church in Halsall, a village in Lancashire, England. It is an active parish church in the Diocese of Liverpool and the archdeaconry of Warrington. The oldest parts of the church date from the 14th century and there have been several alterations and additions. It is recorded in the National Heritage List for England as a designated Grade I listed building.

== History and administration ==
The ecclesiastical parish of Halsall originally included the townships of Halsall, Lydiate, Downholland, Melling and Maghull. The oldest part of the building—the chancel—dates from the early 14th century.

The chancel was restored in 1873 at a cost of £2,000 by the Lancaster architects Paley and Austin. In 1886 the same architects largely rebuilt the nave and aisles, re-roofed and reseated the church, and rebuilt the south porch at a cost of £7,000. The church was designated a Grade I listed building on 23 September 1950. The Grade I designation—the highest of the three grades—is for buildings "of exceptional interest, sometimes considered to be internationally important".

An active church in the Church of England, St Cuthbert's is part of the diocese of Liverpool, which is in the Province of York. It is in the archdeaconry of Warrington and the deanery of Ormskirk.

Notably, Arthur Vaughan Williams, father of composer Ralph Vaughan Williams served at St Cuthberts before he was ordained as a vicar in 1868.

== Architecture ==
=== Exterior ===
St Cuthbert's is constructed of squared sandstone and has stone slate roofs. Its plan consists of a nave with a tower to the west, north and south aisles, a south porch, a chancel to the east and a vestry north of the chancel. In the south-west corner, between the tower and south aisle, there is a room that was originally built as a grammar school.

The tower is 126 feet (38 m) tall and has three stages. The lower stage is square with corner buttresses. There is a flat-headed, two-light west window with tracery. The second stage is octagonal, with flat-headed, two-light belfry louvres. It is topped with a stone spire that has lucarnes (windows). Between the belfry stage and the spire, there is an octagonal parapet with four gargoyles.

The roof of the nave has a flat parapet. The former grammar school that projects south of the building, has a crenellated parapet and its roof is gabled. Above the doorway are the Halsall family arms and an inscription that reads "E. H. 1593". The grammar school has two-light, pointed windows.

The windows of the aisles have flat heads and Perpendicular style tracery. The east window in the chancel has five lights with tracery.

=== Interior and fittings ===
The nave is separated from the tower by a pointed arch. Between the nave and aisles there are arcades of four bays that have octagonal piers and pointed arches with wave moulding. There is a piscina (basin) in the south wall of the south aisle, and another in the north aisle.

The chancel measures 47 feet (14 m) by 20 feet 6 inches (6.25 m). There are triple-sedilia (priest's seats) and a piscina, all in the Decorated style . The three seats and piscina date from the 14th century and all have arches with cinquefoils. There is a reredos from 1886, painted by Shrigley and Hunt. Stained glass in the church includes work by Harry Harvey and Hardman & Co.

== External features ==
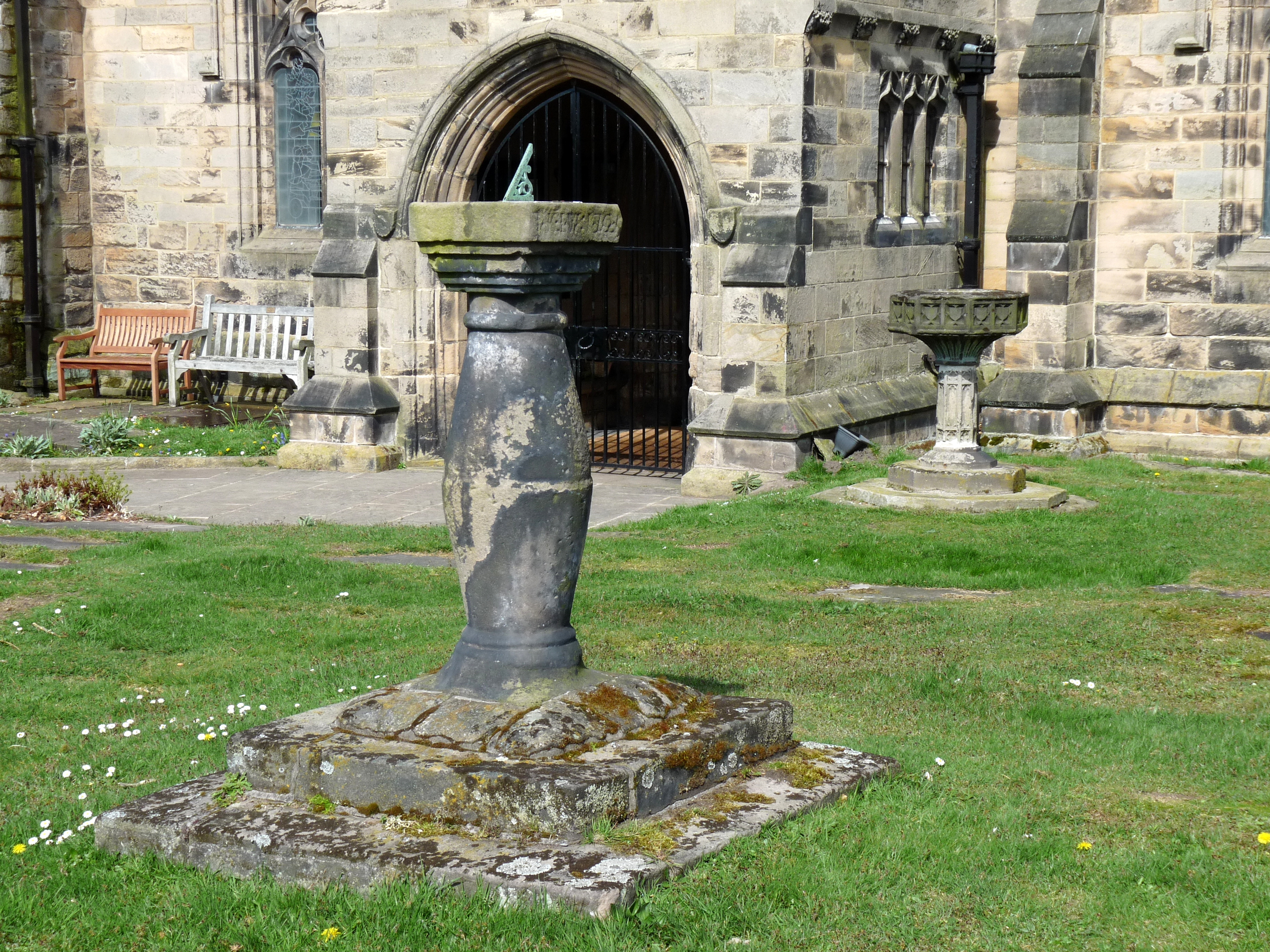
Sundial and baptismal font in the churchyard.

In the churchyard, there are some grave slabs from the Middle Ages that were originally inside the church. There is a sandstone sundial in the churchyard, dating from 1725. Its base has two square steps and there is a baluster stem; the gnomon is probably modern. The sundial has been given a Grade II designation by English Heritage. There is also an octagonal sandstone baptismal font in the churchyard from the 19th century. The font has also received a Grade II listing.

Notable interments at St Cuthbert's include Henry Blundell-Hollinshead-Blundell (1831–1906), a British Army officer and Conservative politician, and the English footballer Billy Ayre (1952–2002). In addition the churchyard contains the war graves of four soldiers of World War I, and two of World War II.

== See also ==
- Grade I listed buildings in Lancashire
- Listed buildings in Halsall
- List of ecclesiastical works by Paley and Austin
