= McKew =

McKew is a surname. Notable people with the surname include:

- Cecil McKew (1887–1974), Australian cricketer
- Maxine McKew (born 1953), Australian politician and journalist
- Robert McKew (died 1944), British military chaplain
- Shane McKew (born 1949), Australian rules footballer

== See also ==
- McKee
