= Kew, Michigan =

- Unincorporated community
- Location within the state of Michigan
- Coordinates: 45°09′31″N 87°36′57″W
- Country: United States
- State: Michigan
- County: Menominee
- Township: Menominee
- Elevation: 620 ft (189 m)
- Time zone: UTC-6 (Central (CST))
  - Summer (DST): UTC-5 (CDT)
- ZIP code(s): 49858
- Area code: 906
- GNIS feature ID: 629639

Kew is an unincorporated community in Menominee County, in the U.S. state of Michigan.

== History ==
The community was named after the Kew Gardens in London.
