= Keewaywin Airport =

- IATA: KEW; ICAO: none; TC LID: CPV8

Summary
- Airport type: Public
- Operator: Government of Ontario
- Location: Keewaywin First Nation
- Time zone: CST (UTC−06:00)
  - Summer (DST): CDT (UTC−05:00)
- Elevation AMSL: 990 ft (300 m)
- Coordinates: 52°59′28″N 092°50′11″W

Map
- Location in Ontario

Runways
Direction	Length		Surface
Direction	ft	m	Surface
13/31	3,511	1,070	Gravel
- Source: Canada Flight Supplement

Keewaywin Airport (IATA: KEW, TC LID: CPV8) is located 2 nautical miles (3.7 km; 2.3 mi) southwest of the First Nations community of Keewaywin, Ontario, Canada.
