= Southport Transit Centre =

Coordinates: 27°57′57.10″S 153°24′48.00″E

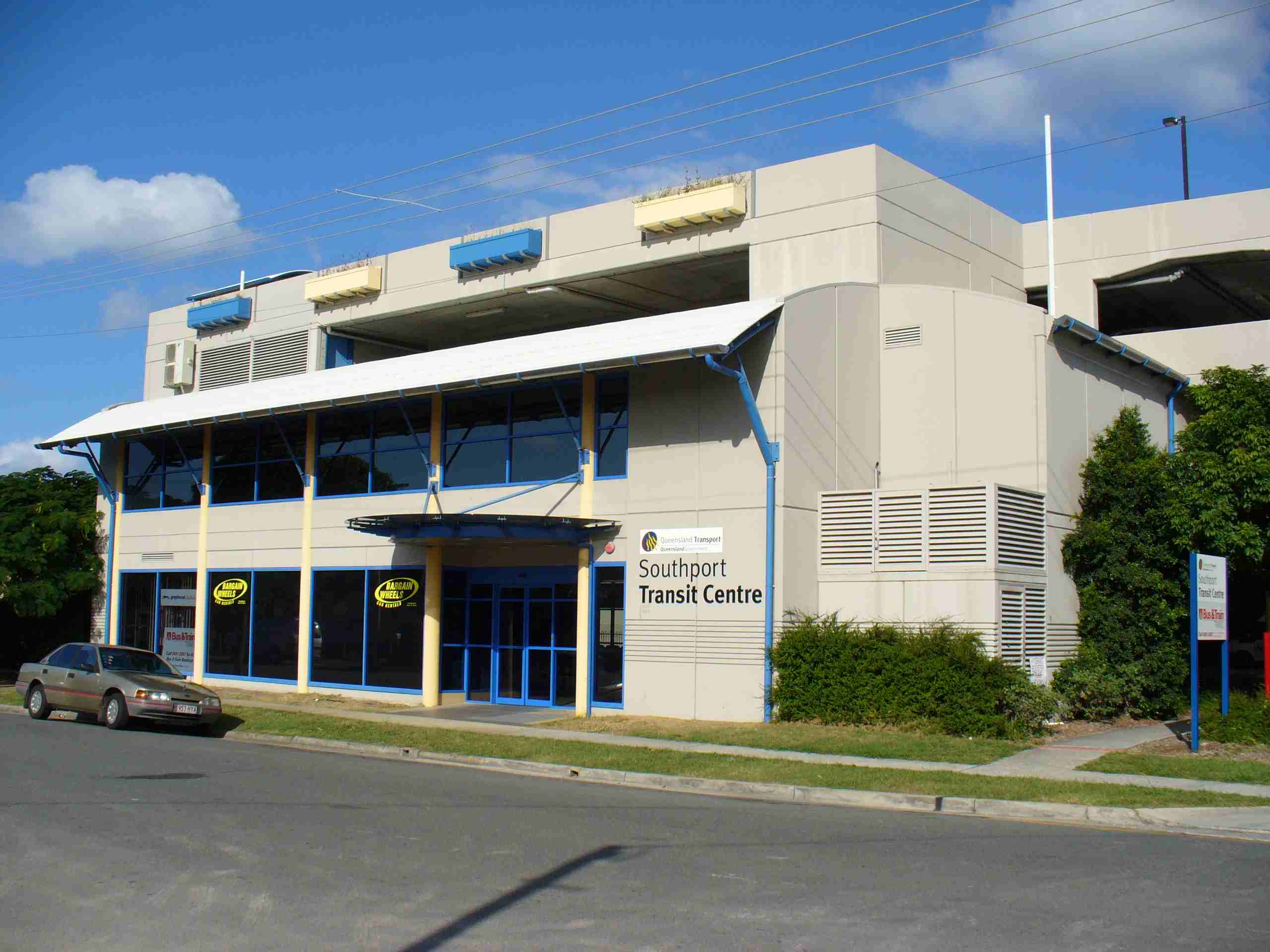
Southport Transit Centre

Southport Transit Centre is on Scarborough Street in Southport, Queensland, Australia. Opened on 29 November 2000 by the Hon. Steve Bredhauer MP, the $6 million Southport Transit Centre Project was a joint partnership between Queensland Transport and the Southport Workers’ Club.

It provides services for private and charter coaches on interstate and intrastate routes.

== See also ==
- Transport on the Gold Coast, Queensland
