= Heathey Lane Halt railway station =

Former railway station in England

Heathey Lane Halt
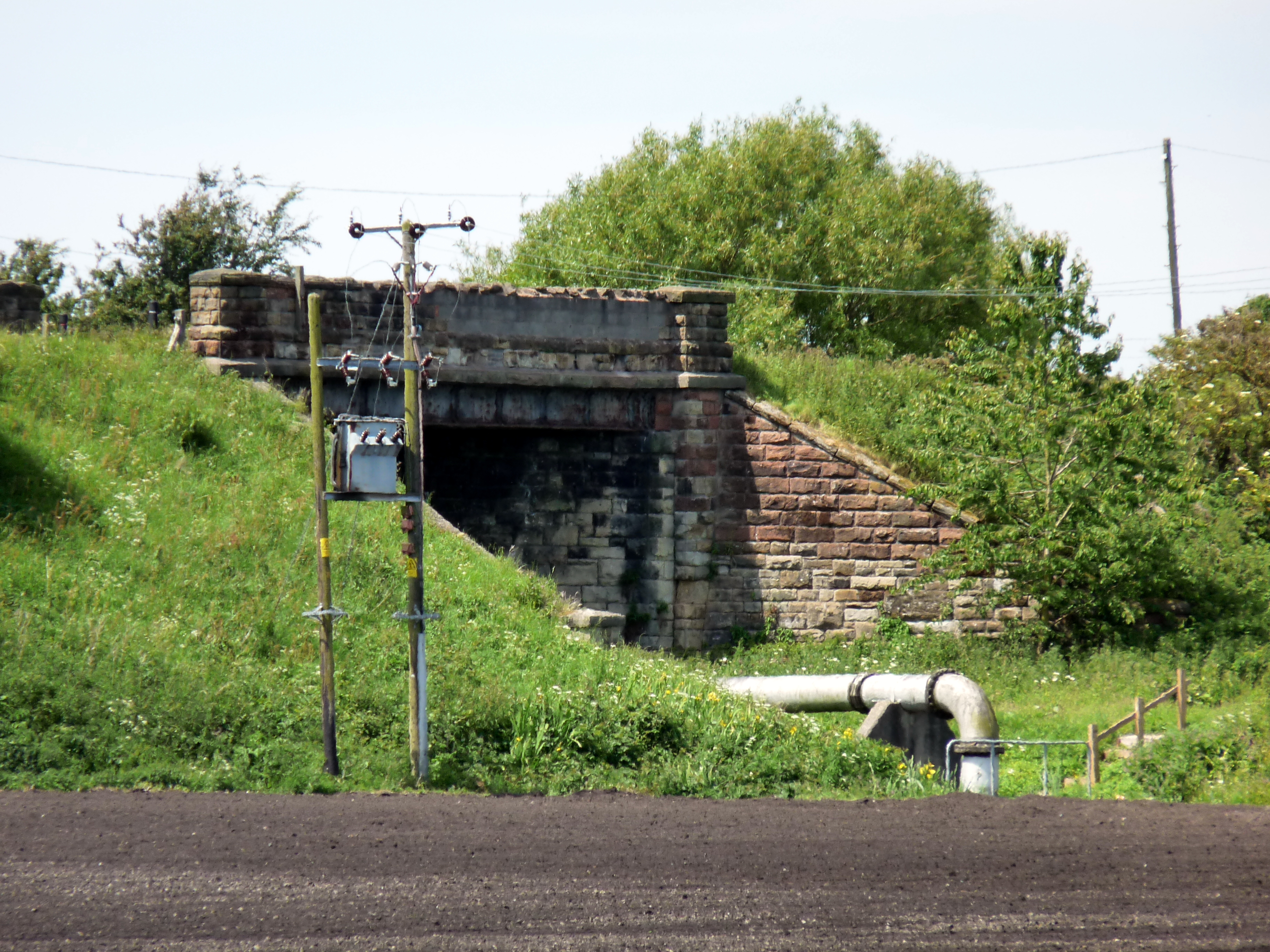
- The site of Heathey Lane Halt in 2009

General information
- Location: West Lancashire; England
- Coordinates: 53.6181°N 2.9720°W
- Platforms: 2

Other information
- Status: Disused

History
- Pre-grouping: Lancashire and Yorkshire Railway
- Post-grouping: London, Midland and Scottish

Key dates
- 1 March 1907: opened
- 26 September 1938: closed to passengers
Location

Heathey Lane Halt was a railway station in the village of Scarisbrick, Lancashire. The station opened on 1 March 1907 as a halt on the Liverpool, Southport and Preston Junction Railway, and consisted of simple cinder based platforms at track level. It was situated to the north of the B5243 road bridge at Heathey Lane, to which it was connected by wooden steps. The station closed to passengers on 26 September 1938, though the line remained open for goods traffic until 21 January 1952. The track was left in place until 1964 for the storage of excursion stock.

Preceding station	Disused railways	Following station
Kew Gardens	Liverpool, Southport and Preston Junction Railway; Barton Branch	Shirdley Hill
