= Kew (Sefton ward) =

Electoral ward of the borough of Sefton, in Merseyside, England

Coordinates: 53.634°N 2.987°W

Kew is a Metropolitan Borough of Sefton ward in the Southport Parliamentary constituency that covers the localities of Kew and Blowick in the town of Southport. During the 2019 local elections the electorate was 10,064. The population of the ward taken at the 2011 census was 12,631.

== Councillors ==
Term	Councillor	Party
2022–present	Laura Lunn Bates	Labour
2021–Present	Jennifer Julie Corcoran	Labour
2019–Present	Sean Halsall	Independent

== Election results ==
Changes in vote share are since the seat was previously contested (i.e. 4 years prior), not since the previous local election.

=== Elections of the 2020s ===
Sefton Metropolitan Borough Council Municipal Elections 2022: Kew
Party	Candidate	Votes	%	±%
Labour	Laura Lunn Bates	1563	50	▲5.2
Conservative	Laura Elizabeth Nuttall	842	27	▲10.0
Liberal Democrats	Vic Foulds	715	23	▼8.0
Majority		721		
Turnout		3120		
Labour hold		Swing		

Sefton Metropolitan Borough Council Municipal Elections 2021: Kew
Party	Candidate	Votes	%	±%
Labour	Jennifer Julie Corcoran	1,079	37	
Conservative	Laura Elizabeth Nuttall	905	31	
Liberal Democrats	Jo Barton	768	26	
Green	Fred Weavers	200	7	
Majority		174	6	
Turnout		2,952	28	
Labour gain from Liberal Democrats		Swing		

=== Elections of the 2010s ===
Sefton Metropolitan Borough Council Municipal Elections 2019: Kew
Party	Candidate	Votes	%	±%
Labour	Sean Halsall	1124	37%	
Liberal Democrats	Jo Barton	791	26%	
UKIP	Sarah Elizabeth Howard	454	15%	
Conservative	Margaret Eileen Middleton	446	15%	
Green	Emma Elizabeth Gillinder	212	7%	
Majority		333		
Turnout		3027		
Labour gain from Liberal Democrats		Swing	{{{swing}}}	

Sefton Metropolitan Borough Council Municipal Elections 2018: Kew
Party	Candidate	Votes	%	±%
Labour	Janis Blackburne	1448	44.8	▲26.0
Liberal Democrats	Fred Weavers	1012	31.3	▼3.0
Conservative	Margaret Middleton	563	17.4	▲4.7
UKIP	Linda Gunn-Russo	128	4.0	▼24.4
Green	Robert Doyle	80	2.5	▼2.7
Majority		436	13.5	
Turnout		3231	32.5	
Labour gain from Liberal Democrats		Swing	14.5	

Sefton Metropolitan Borough Council Municipal Elections 2016: Kew
Party	Candidate	Votes	%	±%
Liberal Democrats	David Pullin	1085	39.5	+2%
Labour	Janet Harrison	680	24.8	−4%
UKIP	Terry Durrance	551	20.1	−1%
Conservative	Tina Bliss	329	12.0	−2%
Green	Richard Furness	102	3.7	N/A
Majority		405	14.7	
Turnout		2747		
Liberal Democrats hold		Swing		

Sefton Metropolitan Borough Council Municipal Elections 2015: Kew
Party	Candidate	Votes	%	±%
Liberal Democrats	Cllr Mike Booth	1842	32.0	−3%
Labour	Janet Harrison	1329	23.1	−4%
UKIP	Philip Cantlay	1251	21.7	+7%
Conservative	Jordan Shandley	1004	17.4	−7%
Green	Neville Grundy	339	5.9	+6%
Majority		513	8.9	
Turnout		5765		
Liberal Democrats hold		Swing		

Sefton Metropolitan Borough Council Municipal Elections 2014: Kew
Party	Candidate	Votes	%	±%
Liberal Democrats	Cllr Fred Weavers	1094	34.3	−19%
UKIP	Mike Lewtas	905	28.4	N/A
Labour	Janet Harrison	600	18.8	+8%
Conservative	Jordan Shandley	406	12.7	−11%
Green	Dave McIntosh	183	5.7	N/A
Majority		189	5.9	
Turnout		3188		
Liberal Democrats hold		Swing		

Sefton Metropolitan Borough Council Municipal Elections 2012: Kew
Party	Candidate	Votes	%	±%
Liberal Democrats	Cllr Maureen Fearn	1028	36.8	−10%
Labour	Janet Catherine Harrison	800	28.6	+22%
UKIP	Michael Cedric Lewtas	578	20.8	+18%
Conservative	Chris Cross	390	14.0	−13%
Majority		228	8.2	
Turnout		2796		
Liberal Democrats hold		Swing		

Sefton Metropolitan Borough Council Municipal Elections 2011: Kew
Party	Candidate	Votes	%	±%
Liberal Democrats	Cllr Mike Booth	1132	34.8	−16%
Labour	Richard James Owens	867	26.6	+20%
Conservative	Cath Regan	777	23.9	−1%
UKIP	Mike Lewtas	481	14.8	N/A
Majority		265	8.2	
Turnout		3257	36%	
Liberal Democrats hold		Swing		

Sefton Metropolitan Borough Council Municipal Elections 2010: Kew
Party	Candidate	Votes	%	±%
Liberal Democrats	Frederick Weavers	2993	52.6	
Conservative	David Robert Thomas Smith	1391	24.5	
Labour	David Stott	615	10.8	
Independent	John Joseph Lee	410	7.2	
BNP	Michael McDermott	237	4.2	
Independent	Jose Miguel Mendoza	43	0.8	
Majority		1602	28.1	
Turnout		5689	62%	
Liberal Democrats hold		Swing		

=== Elections of the 2000s ===
Sefton Metropolitan Borough Council Municipal Elections 2008: Kew
Party	Candidate	Votes	%	±%
Liberal Democrats	Cllr Maureen Fearn	1404	47.3	
Conservative	Anthony White	809	27.3	
Southport Party	John Lee	455	15.3	
Labour	Stephen Jowett	203	6.8	
UKIP	Val Pollard	100	3.4	
Majority		595	20.0	
Turnout		2967		
Liberal Democrats hold		Swing		

Sefton Metropolitan Borough Council Municipal Elections 2007: Kew
Party	Candidate	Votes	%	±%
Liberal Democrats	Mike Booth	1405	51.0	
Conservative	Adam Kennaugh	678	24.6	
Southport Party	John Lee	468	17.0	
Labour	Stephen Jowett	204	7.4	
Majority		727	26.4	
Turnout		2755		
Liberal Democrats hold		Swing		

Sefton Metropolitan Borough Council Municipal Elections 2006: Kew
Party	Candidate	Votes	%	±%
Liberal Democrats	Frederick Weavers	1346	47.3	
Conservative	Terence Jones	649	22.8	
Southport Party	John Lee	475		
Labour	Stephen Jowett	227		
UKIP	Valerie Pollard	149		
Majority		697		
Turnout		2846		
Liberal Democrats hold		Swing		

Sefton Metropolitan Borough Council Municipal Elections 2004: Kew
Party	Candidate	Votes	%	±%
Liberal Democrats	Maureen Fearn	1774	17.8	
Liberal Democrats	Terence Francis	1684	16.9	
Liberal Democrats	Fred Weavers	1340	13.4	
Southport Party	Russell Watson	948	9.5	
Southport Party	Anthony Holland	918	9.2	
Southport Party	John Lee	859	8.6	
Conservative	Marilyn Hunton	612	6.1	
Conservative	David Woodfine	603	6.0	
Conservative	Charles Lyon-Taylor	584	5.9	
Labour	Graham Brannan	379	3.8	
Labour	Eunice Slatcher	291	2.9	
Majority		N/A		
Turnout		9992		
Liberal Democrats hold		Swing		
