= Halsall =

Village in Lancashire, England

Coordinates: 53.584°N 2.953°W

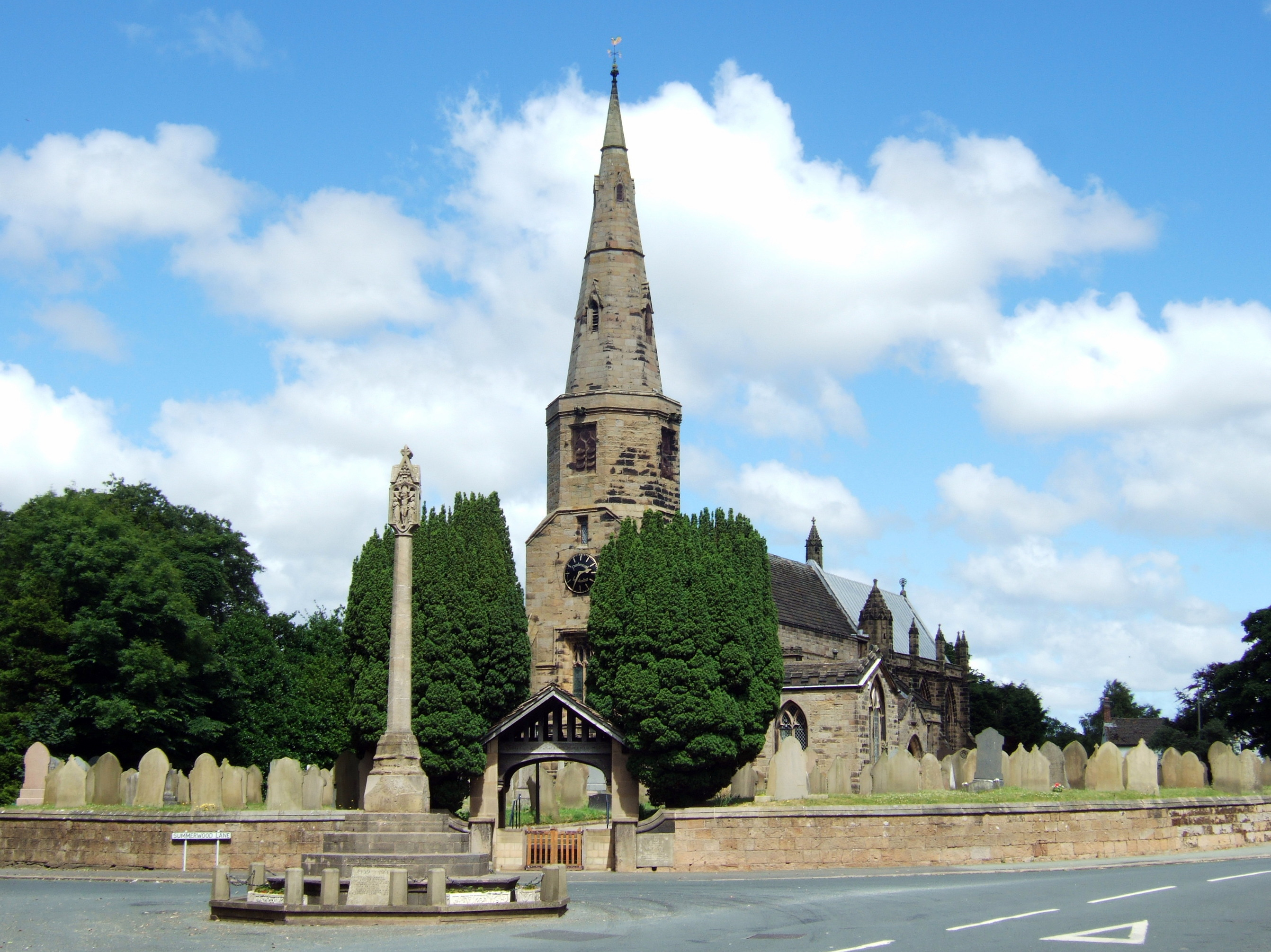
- St Cuthbert's Church and Halsall War Memorial

- Location in West Lancashire Location within Lancashire
- Population: 2,057 (2011)
- OS grid reference: SD369101
- Civil parish: Halsall
- District: West Lancashire
- Shire county: Lancashire
- Region: North West
- Country: England
- Sovereign state: United Kingdom
- Post town: Ormskirk
- Postcode district: L39
- Dialling code: 01704
- Police: Lancashire
- Fire: Lancashire
- Ambulance: North West
- UK Parliament: West Lancashire

Halsall is a village and civil parish in West Lancashire, England, located close to Ormskirk on the A5147 and Leeds and Liverpool Canal.

== Description ==
Historically known as Heleshala, Herleshala, (Domesday Book); Haleshal, 1224; Haleshale, 1275; Halsale, 1278; Halshale, 1292; Halleshale, 1332; Halsall, xv century.

Halsall is a large ancient parish which grew from being a small farming settlement; reflecting this background, much of the land area of Halsall is sparsely populated with many isolated dwellings. The land area (and postal area) of Halsall extends quite a way towards Ainsdale along Carr Moss Lane, to a point where the border is closer to Ainsdale village centre than it is to Halsall.

Halsall village is centred around St Cuthbert's Church and the war memorial. The church dates from the 14th century. The hall is to the south-west of the church; between them was a water-mill, taken down about 1880. Near the site of the water mill now stands the former Halsall Arms public house (now offices for business).

There is a junior school, St Cuthbert's Church of England Primary School with around 140 pupils from age 4 to 11. The Saracen's Head is a large public house on the banks of the canal. There is also a garage, offices (in what used to be the Halsall Arms public house) and a red telephone box situated by the former post office.

The church and much of the village stand on a rocky ridge, in marked contrast to the low-lying flat peat mossland between the ridge and the sand of Ainsdale and Birkdale.

There are several listed buildings in Halsall including the Grade I listed church including Halsall Hall and a number of listed canal bridges amongst other structures. Halsall Hall still stands, but it has been subdivided into a number of dwellings.

In 2011, the parish had a population of 2,057 and covered an area of 2,801 hectares (28.01 km^{2}; 10.81 sq mi).

A natural curiosity of the district was the bituminous turf which was found in the Halsall moss. This was known as Lit-turf and could be burnt like a candle.

== The Leeds to Liverpool Canal ==
Halsall is where the first sod was ceremonially dug (on 5 November 1770, by the Hon. Charles Mordaunt of Halsall Hall) for the commencement of the Leeds and Liverpool Canal. A sculpture ("Halsall Navvy" by Thompson Dagnall) just across the bridge from the Saracen's Head pub now commemorates this.

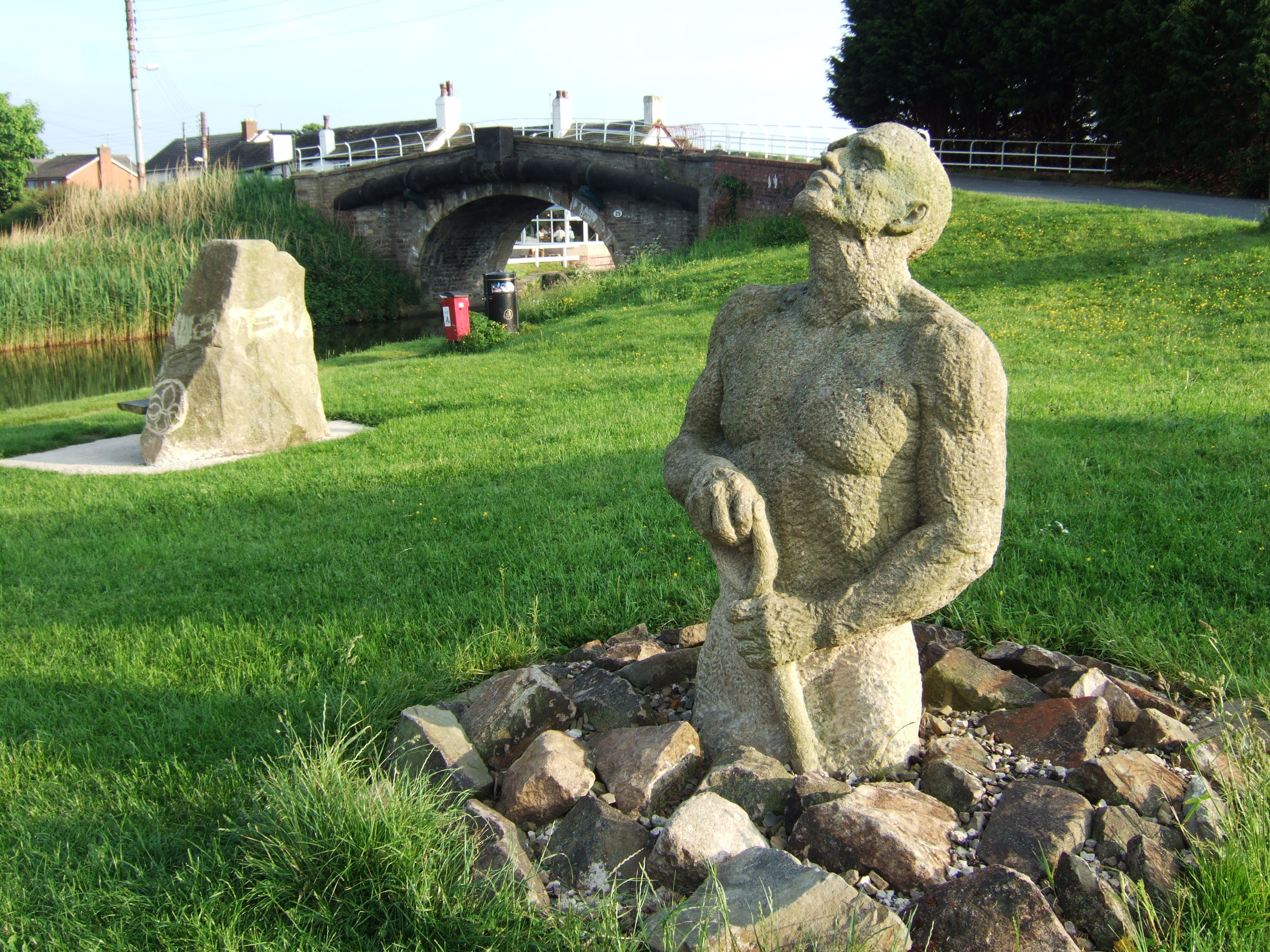
Halsall Navvy by Thompson Dagnall

The canal in this area was partially fortified with pillboxes and anti tank measures as it formed part of Stop Line 14 in WW2.

== Transport ==
The village has five bus stops, served by the 300 bus route, operated by Arriva North West, travelling from Liverpool to Southport (and the reverse). Halsall railway station on the Liverpool, Southport and Preston Junction Railway was in service between 1887 and 1938.

== Culture ==
Halsall plays host to the annual scarecrow festival. The festival runs from June to July. The official route for the scarecrow festival was down the main road through the village but the scarecrows have spread to the surrounding areas. The scarecrow festival is not a competition.

== Notable people ==
- Harry Tyrer (1868–1935), footballer who played 97 games, including 83 for Darwen F.C. (1870)
- Bob Wright (1886–1943), greyhound trainer at La Mancha Kennels. He trained three Waterloo Cup winners

== See also ==
- Listed buildings in Halsall
