= Liverpool, Southport and Preston Junction Railway =

Railway line in the UK

Overview
- Locale: Lancashire; Merseyside

History
- Work began: 7 August 1884
- Completed: 2 September 1887
- Taken-over by L&YR: 1 July 1897
- Closed for passengers: 26 September 1938
- 14 June 1968: Closed for freight

Technical
- Track gauge: 1,435 mm (4 ft 8 1/2 in) standard gauge

The Liverpool, Southport and Preston Junction Railway ran from Southport to a junction with the Southport and Cheshire Lines Extension Railway in northwest England. It provided a through connection for the West Lancashire Railway to Liverpool. It opened in 1887 and became part of the Lancashire & Yorkshire Railway in 1897.

== Background ==
When the West Lancashire Railway (WLR) was opened throughout in 1882 linking Southport to Preston it found itself surrounded by the L&YR, who had until then held a near monopoly. The L&YR had two railways to Southport, one from Liverpool, the former Liverpool, Crosby and Southport Railway, and one from Wigan and Manchester, the former Manchester and Southport Railway.

Before the WLR was opened another railway, the Southport and Cheshire Lines Extension Railway (SCLER), connecting Southport with Aintree and Liverpool via the Cheshire Lines Committee (CLC) had been authorised and construction was underway, it opened in 1884.

In January 1882 the WLR proposed a line running in a tunnel under the Southport promenade to connect with the SCLER as a way to escape from the domination of the L&YR and provide themselves with a viable route to Liverpool. The scheme was withdrawn when the corporation objected to it, but the idea was valid and led to a subsequent proposal for the Liverpool, Southport and Preston Junction Railway (LS&PJR).

== Authorisation ==
The railway was promoted, as named in the Bill, by the Marquess de Castéja, (Note: The Marquess de Castéja whose full name was Rémy Léon de Biaudos Scarisbrick had inherited Scarisbrick Hall and estate on 6 March 1872.) Henry Blundell-Hollinshead-Blundell (both were local land owners), Edward Holden, Thomas Fisher, Thomas Henry Isherwood (all three were directors of the WLR) and Walter Smith who had been the contractor for the SCLER. (Note: A proposal for an act of Parliament is known as a bill in the UK.)

Southport Borough Council initially opposed the Bill mostly to ensure that the final Act included clauses to protect Southport's interests. Council detractors pointed out that this railway and the projected Blackpool Railway, both of which were being presented to Parliament in the 1884 session amounted to a railway to Blackpool and not Southport.

Liverpool Southport and Preston Junction Railway Act 1884
- Act of Parliament
- Parliament of the United Kingdom
- Long title: An Act to authorise the making of Railways in the County of Lancaster to connect the Railway of the West Lancashire Railway Company with the Railway of the Southport and Cheshire Lines Extension Railway Company and for other purposes.
- Citation: 47 & 48 Vict. c. ccxxvi

Dates
- Royal assent: 7 August 1884

Text of statute as originally enacted

The bill proceeded to Parliament and the company was formed by the Liverpool Southport and Preston Junction Railway Act 1884 (47 & 48 Vict. c. ccxxvi). The new company was closely allied to the WLR, it shared several directors, had the same secretary, Thomas Gilbert, had the same engineers, James Brunlees and Charles Douglas Fox and used the same office headquarters in Southport.

== Construction ==
Braddock was the contractor for the line which only had one major work, a bridge over the L&YR at Blowick. The bridge had five iron spans on groups of iron columns that had to be sunk to a depth of 63 feet (19 m) before they found a firm foundation.

== Opening ==
The Railway Inspectorate inspected the line and the opening was advertised for 1 September 1887. On the opening day the company found that the contractor, who had a dispute with the company, had removed rails from both of the junctions with the WLR at Meols Cop. The line had to be opened a day late after an injunction had been obtained against the contractor. Passenger services started therefore on 2 September running from Southport Central to Barton.

Through goods trains onto the SCLER started on 1 October 1887 and on 1 November 1887 passenger services were extended onto the SCLER terminating at Altcar and Hillhouse.

== Description ==
The railway was a double track line 7 miles 3 furlongs (12 km) long staring with a junction with the SCLER just north of Altcar and Hillhouse to two junctions with the WLR at Meols Cop, Southport. (Note: Railways in the United Kingdom are, for historical reasons, measured in miles and chains. A chain is 22 yards (20 m) long, there are 80 chains to the mile. Occasionally furlongs are also used, there are 10 chains to the furlong.)

The railway had running powers over the SCLER to Aintree. These together with the WLR and the LS&PJR provided a coherent route from Liverpool to Southport and Preston.

Stations were at:

- Meols Cop
- Kew Gardens
- Shirdley Hill
- Halsall
- Barton

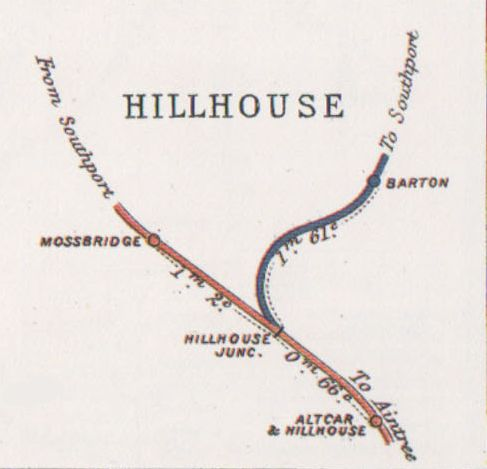
Railway Junctions Diagram of Hillhouse Junction

== Rolling stock ==
The LS&PJR and WLR both had a varied fleet of locomotives, although separate companies they shared a lot of facilities and staff. Their locomotives were administered separately until December 1888 when they combined their locomotive stocks and operated a single stable.

Six locomotives were needed to work the LS&PJR when it opened, they were purchased by Edward Holden and leased to the railway. They carried a brass plate inside the cab inscribed "Edward Holden Esq., Shipley, Owner." The plates were removed in August 1895 when the company purchased the locomotives from Mr. Holden.

The locomotive fleet consisted of:

- Two 0-6-0 locomotives built by Sharp, Stewart and Company and purchased second-hand from the Furness Railway,
- Two 0-6-2T locomotives purchased new from Kitson and Company,
- Two 2-4-2T locomotives purchased new from Kitson and Company.

Carriage stock was all former London, Brighton and South Coast Railway, transferred from the WLR, it retained the original brown livery.

Edward Holden purchased 150 assorted goods wagons, leasing them to the railway on the same terms as the locomotives.

== Operational issues ==
In 1884, prior to the railway opening, it had been agreed that the WLR would work the railway but this was rescinded by the West Lancashire Railway Act 1887. (Note: The full text of the West Lancashire Railway Act 1887 was not available as at August 2026, The Acts description was: "An Act to confer further powers on the West Lancashire Railway Company in relation to their Preston Docks Extension Railway and for other purposes.")

The WLR had negotiated with the MS&LR to take over both lines when they were complete. Cotterall (1982) comments:

It is difficult to see any other reason for the line being built, as it was marginally shorter than the existing Cheshire Lines Committee Extension Railway between Southport and Altcar, and served only three villages, Barton, Halsall and Downholland, in addition to two suburban stations within Southport. The projected take-over, which would have given the MS&LR direct access to Preston was the only feasible explanation for the line being constructed.

The MS&LR made preparations to work the WLR and LS&PJR in 1885, planning to get parliamentary approval in 1886 but decided against doing so. There were two reasons for them to decline, firstly after an examination of the WLR accounts the MS&LR concluded that the cost of running the WLR, if the accounts were properly adjusted, was in excess of the receipts, and secondly the LS&PJR would not be completed by the summer of 1886 as planned.

The MS&LR renewed its interest in WLR and LS&PJR as the LS&PJR was nearing completion in 1887 because once open the MS&LR would have access to Preston and that combined with the projected Blackpool Railway, of which the MS&LR was a major sponsor, would enable an alternative route to Blackpool. Agreement was reached between the three companies such that the MS&LR gained running powers on the WLR and LS&PJR who in turn would gain access to Blackpool.

Several extensions were requested of Parliamentary to extend the time to make the Blackpool Railway but eventually in 1895 there was significant opposition and the powers lapsed. The land was disposed of starting in 1896 as and when required and the MS&LR assured the L&YR and the London and North Western Railway (L&NWR) that they had abandoned their interest.

== Receivership ==
The collapse of the Blackpool scheme and the reports that the railway was making a loss every half-yearly accounting period saw the company into receivership on 2 February 1889, Edward Holden, the chairman, was appointed as receiver and manager.

== Lancashire and Yorkshire Railway ==
The various schemes to find alternative routes to Blackpool concerned the L&YR and it decided to ensure it had control of any future schemes by making the WLR and the LS&PJR an offer to take them over.

The possibility of a take over was discussed in January 1897 at the half-yearly general meeting of the company when the shareholders eventually agreed to the proposed terms for a take-over by the L&YR.

The LS&PJR along with the WLR was to be absorbed from 1 July 1897 for an annual rent of £11,500 rising by annual increments to a maximum of £18,000 (approximately £1.3 million rising to £2 million equivalent in July 2026).

At Southport, passenger trains were rerouted into the adjacent L&YR's Chapel Street Station, with Southport Central closing on 1 April 1901 the old station re-opened on 10 March 1913 as Southport Kensington Road goods station.

The line from Meols Cop to both junctions with the former WLR was electrified in February 1909 by the L&YR to exploit the area's potential for commuter traffic.

Under L&YR ownership the line was known also as the Barton branch and was notable for the railmotor "Altcar Bob" service, introduced in July 1906, four new halts were opened for the service, New Cut Lane Halt and Plex Moss Lane Halt in 1906, Heathey Lane Halt in 1907 and Butts Lane Halt in 1909.

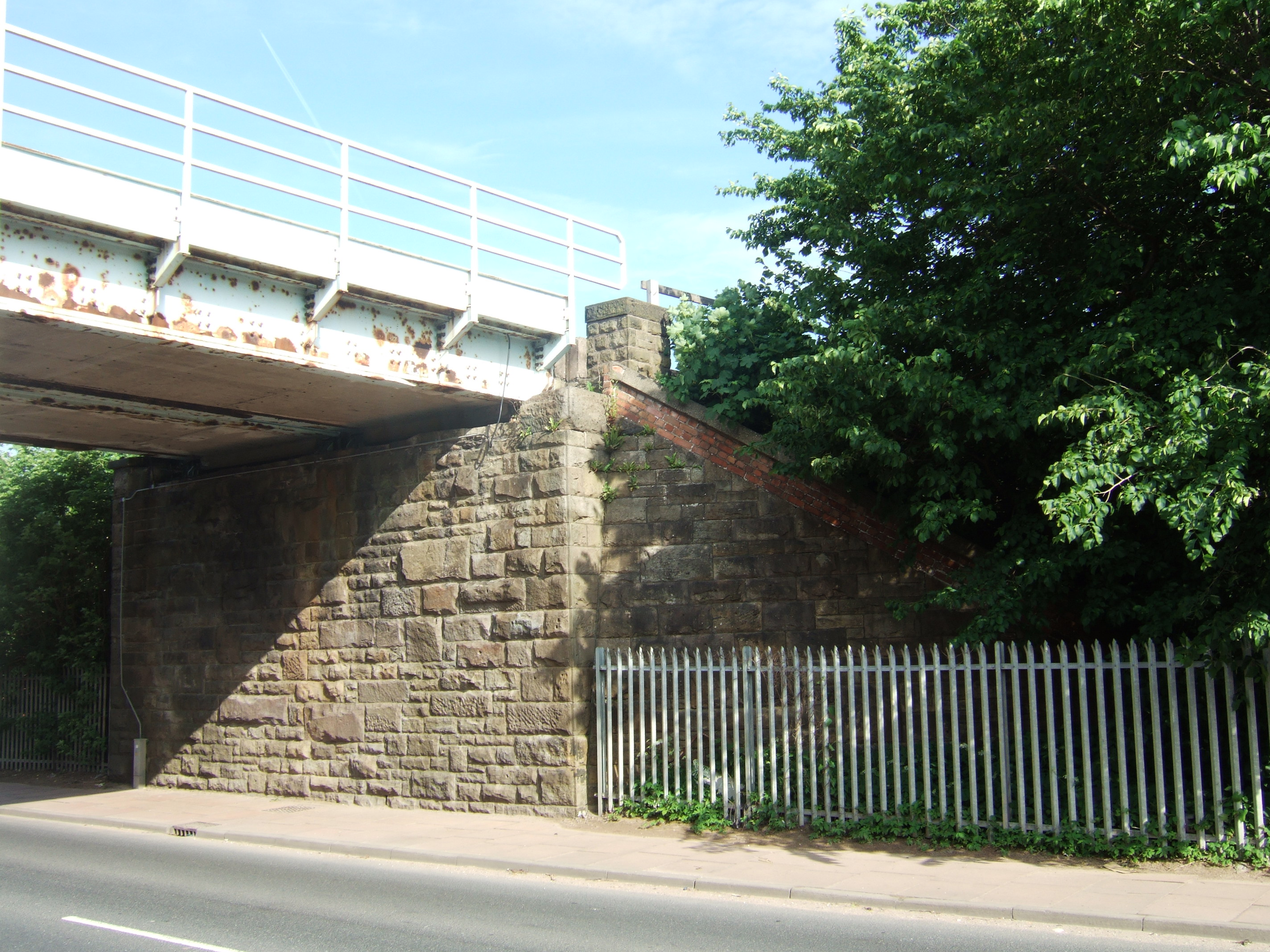
Site of Butts Lane Halt

== Closure ==
The passenger service was cut-back in 1926, only going as far as Downholland, the new name for Barton station. The line closed to passengers on 26 September 1938.

The line mostly closed to goods traffic on 7 July 1952 with only the section between Blowick and Shirdley Hill remaining in use to store excursion stock until it closed in 1964.

The line from Butts Lane junction to Hawkshead Street junction is still open having replaced a section of the original Manchester and Southport Railway using a cut-off constructed in 1911. The electrification in the section was removed in April 1970.

== Bibliography ==
- Baxter, Bertram (1982a). Baxter, David (ed.). British Locomotive Catalogue 1825–1923. Vol. 3B: Lancashire and Yorkshire Railway and its constituent companies. Ashbourne, Derbyshire: Moorland Publishing Company. ISBN 0-903485-85-0.
- Brown, Joe (2021). Liverpool & Manchester Railway Atlas. Manchester: Crécy Publishing. ISBN 9780860936879. OCLC 1112373294.
- Cotterall, J.E. (1982). The West Lancashire Railway. Oakwood.
- Dow, George (1985) [1962]. Great Central, Volume Two: Dominion of Watkin 1864–1899. Shepperton: Ian Allan. ISBN 978-0-7110-1469-5. OCLC 655324061.
- Greville, M.D.; Holt, G.O. (March 1960). "Railway Development in Preston—2" (PDF). The Railway Magazine. Vol. 106, no. 707. pp. 197–203. Archived from the original on 19 December 2013.
- Holt, Geoffrey O.; Biddle, Gordon (1986). The North West. A Regional history of the railways of Great Britain. Vol. 10 (2nd ed.). David St. John Thomas. ISBN 978-0-946537-34-1. OCLC 643506870.
- Jacobs, Gerald (2009). "Railway Mileages". In Bridge, Mike (ed.). TRACKatlas of Mainland Britain. Bradford on Avon: Trackmaps. ISBN 978-0-9549866-5-0.
- Marshall, John (1969). The Lancashire & Yorkshire Railway. Vol. 1. Newton Abbot: David & Charles. ISBN 978-0-7153-4352-4.
- Marshall, John (1972). The Lancashire & Yorkshire Railway. Vol. 3. Newton Abbot: David & Charles. ISBN 978-0-7153-5320-2.
- Marshall, John (1981). North-West England. Forgotten Railways. Vol. 9. David & Charles. ISBN 0-7153-8003-6.
- Simmons, Jack (1997). "running powers". In Simmons, Jack; Biddle, Gordon (eds.). The Oxford Companion to British Railway History From 1603 to the 1990s (1st ed.). Oxford: Oxford University Press. p. 428. ISBN 0-19-211697-5.
- Suggitt, Gordon (2004) [2003]. Lost Railways of Lancashire (Reprinted from 2003 original with revisions ed.). Newbury: Countryside Books. ISBN 978-1-85306-801-0.
