= Butts Lane Halt railway station =

Disused railway station in England

Butts Lane Halt
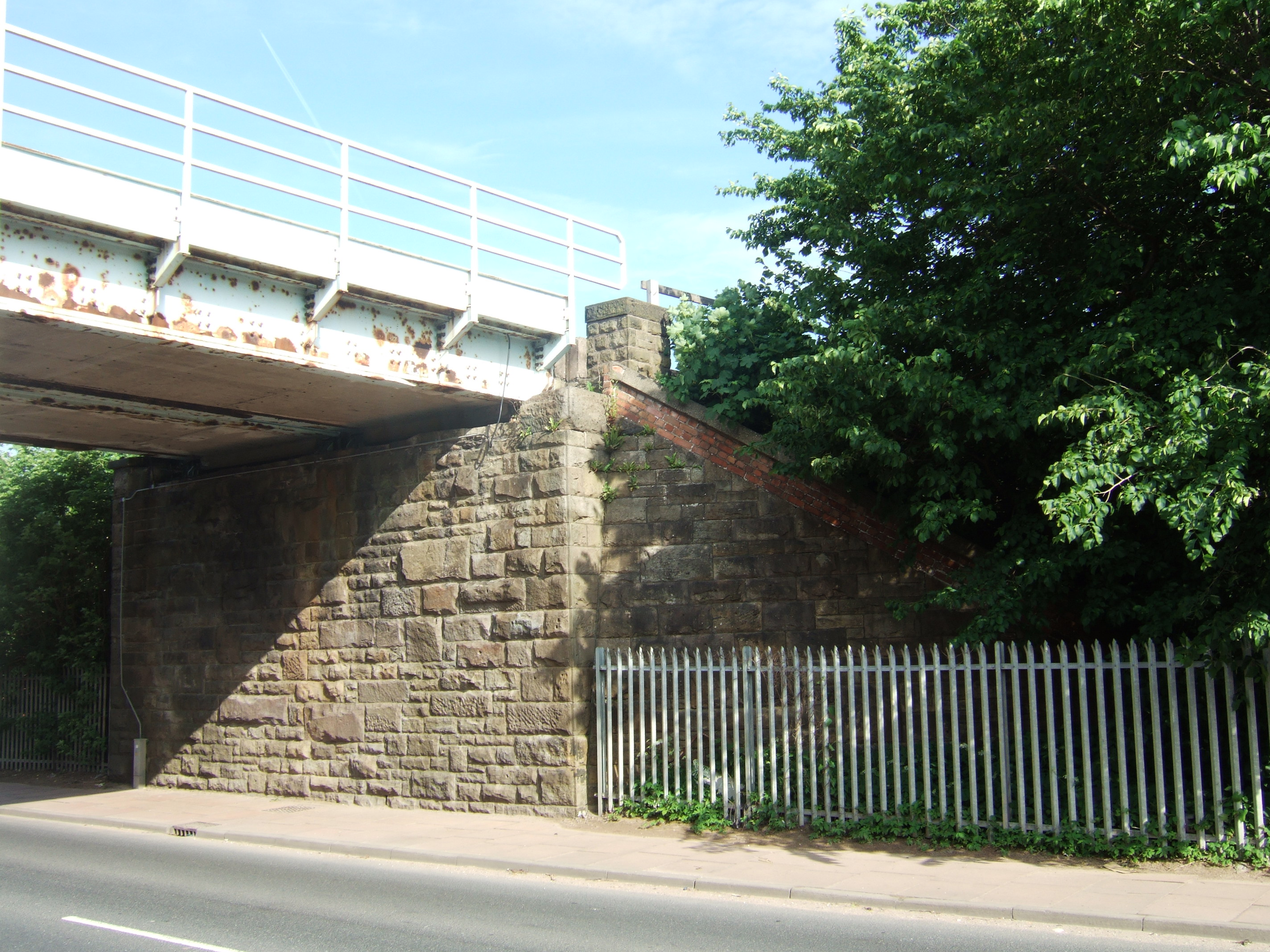
- The site of Butts Lane Halt in 2008

General information
- Location: Southport, Sefton; England
- Coordinates: 53.6393°N 2.9695°W
- Grid reference: SD359163
- Platforms: 2

Other information
- Status: Disused

History
- Pre-grouping: Lancashire and Yorkshire Railway
- Post-grouping: London, Midland and Scottish

Key dates
- 18 December 1909: opened
- 26 September 1938: closed to passengers
Location

Butts Lane Halt was a railway station in the Blowick suburb of Southport, Merseyside.

== History ==
The station opened on 18 December 1909 as a halt on the Liverpool, Southport and Preston Junction Railway, and consisted of simple cinder based platforms at track level, situated on an embankment to the south of Butts Lane bridge.

The station closed on 26 September 1938, though the line remains open and is today used by trains on the Northern Manchester to Southport Line.

Preceding station	Disused railways	Following station
Meols Cop	Liverpool, Southport and Preston Junction Railway; Barton Branch	Kew Gardens
