= Barton railway station =

Lancashire and Yorkshire Railway station

Barton
- View of Barton railway station, looking north towards Southport

General information
- Location: Barton, West Lancashire; England
- Coordinates: 53.5726°N 2.9725°W
- Platforms: 2

Other information
- Status: Disused

History
- Original company: Liverpool, Southport and Preston Junction Railway
- Pre-grouping: London and North Western Railway
- Post-grouping: London, Midland and Scottish

Key dates
- 1 November 1887: Opened as Barton
- 2 June 1924: renamed Downholland
- 26 September 1938: closed passenger services
- 1952: closed for all traffic
Location

Barton was a railway station in the village of Barton, Lancashire, on the Liverpool, Southport and Preston Junction Railway. Situated to the south of the roadbridge on Station Road (off the A5147), the station opened on 1 November 1887, and was renamed Downholland on 2 June 1924. Downholland largely served as the terminus for trains coming from Southport (initially Southport Central, then Southport Chapel Street from 1901), though through trains to Altcar and Hillhouse operated until 1926. The Barton Branch was notable for the "Altcar Bob" service, introduced in July 1906.

The station closed to passengers on 26 September 1938, though the line remained open for goods traffic until 21 January 1952. The tracks were lifted shortly thereafter. The site now lies within the boundaries of a local nature reserve, and the heavily overgrown platforms can still be seen.

Preceding station	Disused railways	Following station
Halsall until 1906	Liverpool, Southport and Preston Junction Railway; Barton Branch	Altcar and Hillhouse until 1926
Plex Moss Lane Halt from 1906	Liverpool, Southport and Preston Junction Railway; Barton Branch	Terminus from 1926
