= Railmotor =

United Kingdom railcar terminology

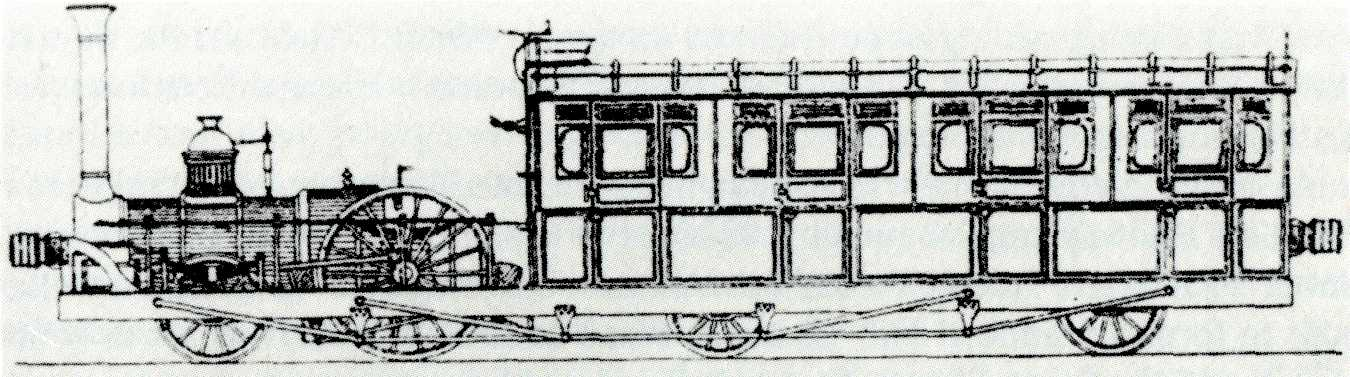
2-2-0 steam railmotor Enfield built by William Adams for the Eastern Counties Railway in 1849. Note the raised buffers for use with other rolling stock.

Railmotor is a term used in the United Kingdom, Ireland and the Commonwealth for a railway lightweight railcar, usually consisting of a railway carriage with a steam traction unit, or a diesel or petrol engine, integrated into it.

== Steam railcars ==
=== Overview ===
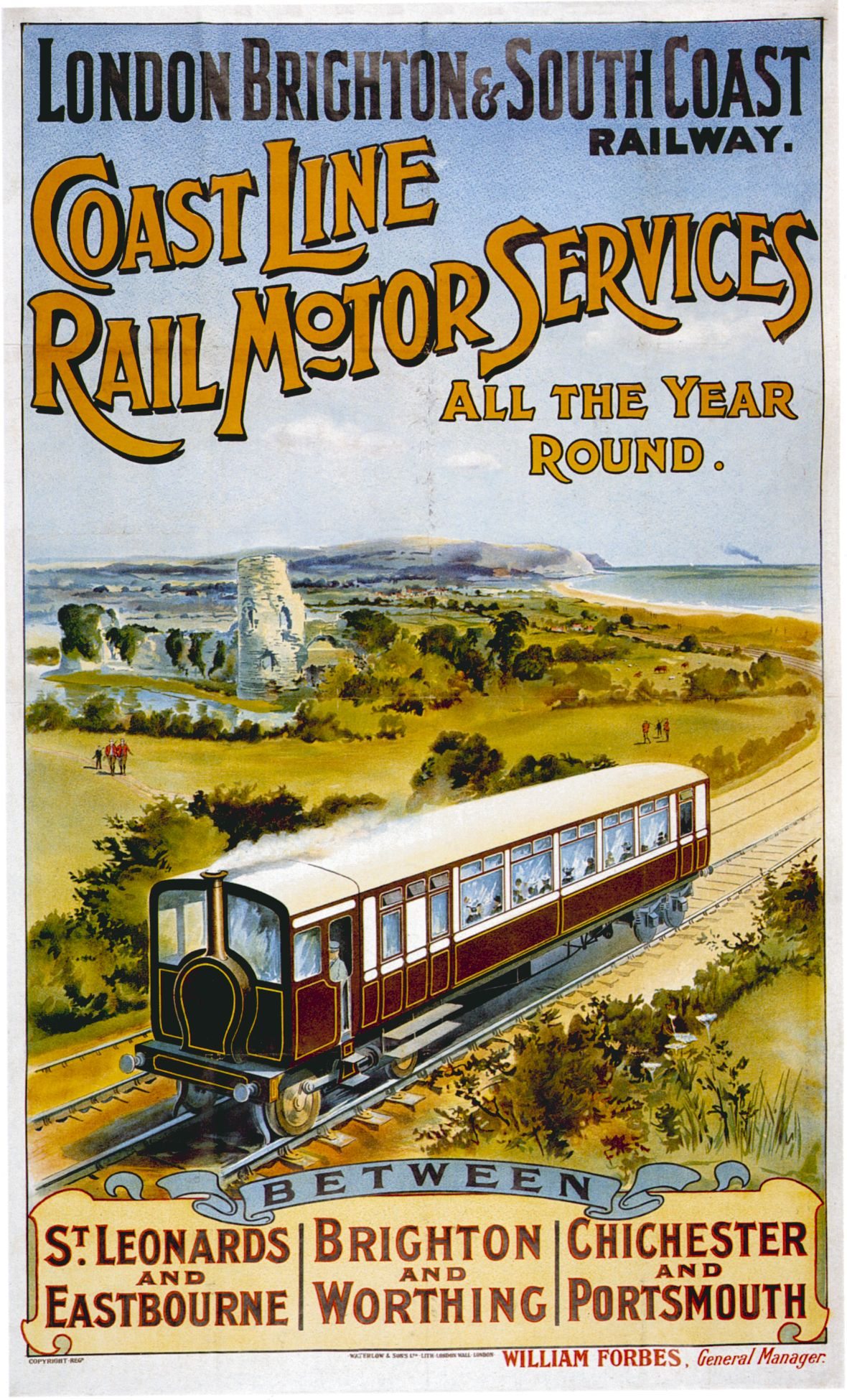
A poster for a London, Brighton and South Coast Railway railmotor service

In the earliest days of railways, designers wished to produce a vehicle for passenger carrying that was economical to build and operate on routes where passenger numbers were light. A single coach with its own prime mover was a solution adopted in some cases; this may be thought of as the predecessor to the railcar, a term more associated with the use of internal combustion engines.

William Bridges Adams started building railmotors in small numbers as early as 1848. The Bristol and Exeter Railway used a steam carriage.

In most cases the early designs were unsuccessful technically, but in the early years of the twentieth century, street-running passenger tramways started to use small steam engines to draw tramcars, replacing the customary horse traction. In many cases the tramways soon adopted electric traction instead, and the attractiveness of the cheap and frequent conveyance abstracted business from the railways in urban areas.

The railways responded by opening new stopping places (to serve more closely the new suburban housing) and sought to reduce their operating cost by reintroducing railmotors, which were cheaper to construct. The London and North Western Railway, Lancashire and Yorkshire Railway, London, Brighton and South Coast Railway, Great North of Scotland Railway and Great Western Railway also introduced railmotors. Nonetheless, the railmotors had a number of disadvantages: their frequency, and the closeness of their stopping places, could not match that of the tramcars. The intrinsic compromises in fitting a steam engine inside the limited space available made them mechanically inefficient, and their power was typically insufficient to handle attached vehicles for parcels or additional coaches at times of exceptional demand such as public holidays. Most still required a three-man crew (driver, fireman and guard), a significant expense compared with a tramcar's single crewman.

They also encountered operational and maintenance problems on railways used to treating locomotives and carriages as separate entities: Servicing the prime mover in a locomotive shed or workshop frequently soiled the carriage body and interior, and with some railmotor designs, the problem was aggravated by a requirement that some mechanical work be carried out from inside the carriage portion. Stabling railmotors in carriage sheds meant introducing the unit's smoke, steam, ash and dust into a relatively clean environment and requiring more effort to keep not only the railmotor but other carriages stabled alongside it suitably clean, and carriage sheds did not have staff trained in servicing and maintaining the power units of railmotors. Some railways invested in dedicated sheds to store and service railmotors, but this merely introduced additional running and manning costs which further reduced the railmotors' supposed economy of operation.

=== Designs ===
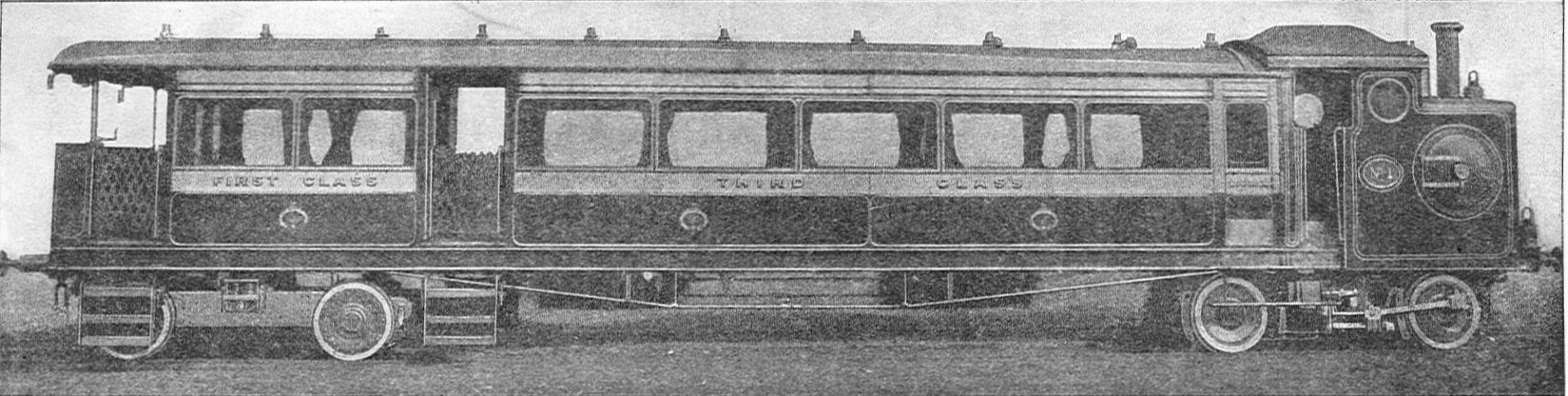
0-2-2 Taff Vale railmotor, c.1912

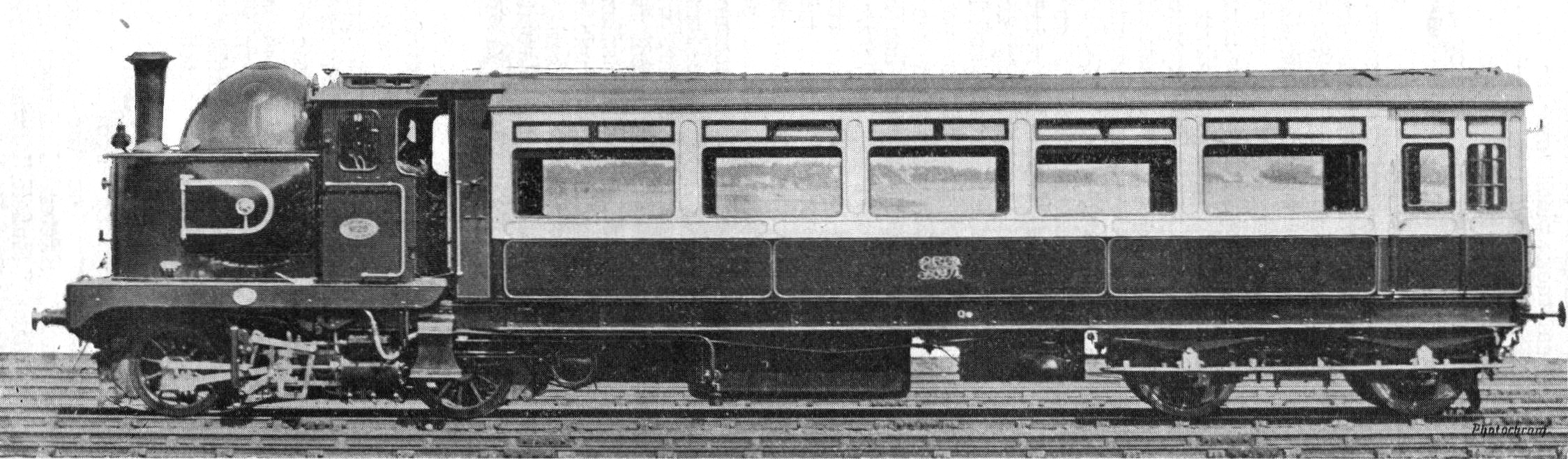
Great North of Scotland Railway steam railmotor (The Railway Magazine, issue 100, October 1905)

There were two basic designs:

- A small 0-4-0 or 0-2-2 steam locomotive with one end of a coach hung on it like an articulated lorry.
- A coach with a steam engine built into one end of it. This type would sometimes have a vertical boiler.

These machines were not a great success because they lacked flexibility. Most could haul a single trailer, but no more. This meant they were unable to cope with greater than expected passenger demands – a classic example being busy market days on an otherwise lightly used rural branch line. They were also unable to haul goods wagons, requiring a conventional locomotive to be stationed on the same line in any case for these duties. In several cases railmotors were victims of their own success - the increased service frequency and more modern rolling stock that the railmotors provided, plus the opening of additional halts along lines that were often part of a conversion to railmotor operation, lead to significant increases in passenger numbers and loadings, requiring the addition of driving trailers to meet demand which overtaxed the low-powered machinery of many railmotor designs, especially on routes with steep gradients. For this reason, they were largely superseded by push-pull trains and the GWR converted some of their railmotors into autocoaches for this purpose. The South Eastern and Chatham Railway built its P Class of small, light tank locomotives specifically to replace railmotors in the 1900s, while the London and South Western Railway introduced its C14 Class which were essentially self-contained railmotor power units that allowed greater flexibility by separating the engine and the carriage sections for working as push-pull trains.

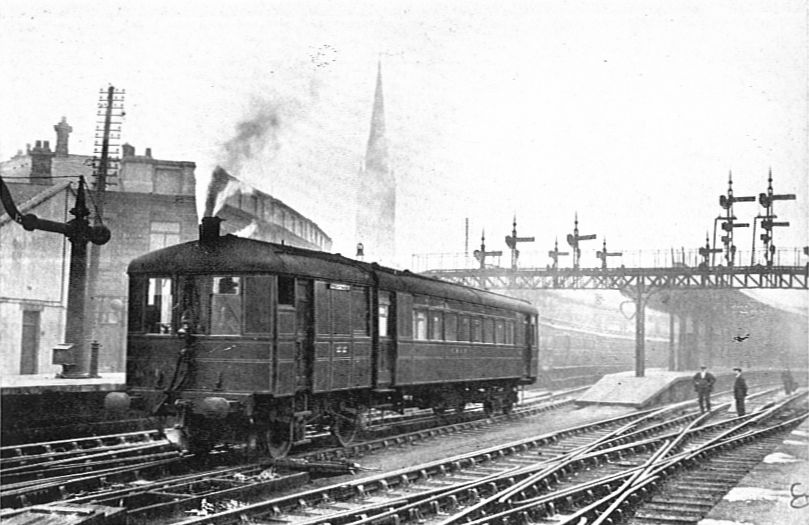
LNER Sentinel-Cammell steam railcar

In the late 1920s, there was another revival of railmotors with the introduction of new designs from Clayton and Sentinel with high-speed motors and geared drive. The London and North Eastern Railway bought over 80 of them but, again, they were short-lived. Some lasted no more than 10 years and all had been withdrawn by 1947.

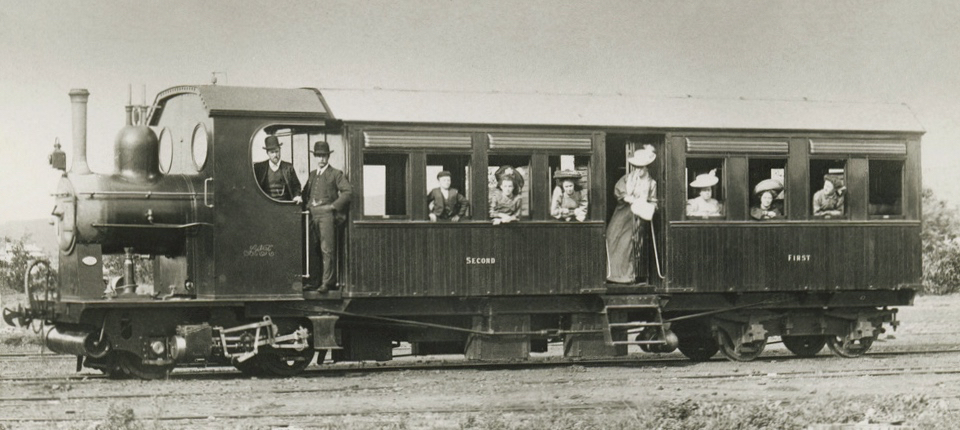
South Australian Railways "Steam Motor Coach" no. 1, soon nicknamed "The Coffee Pot", pictured in 1906. Restored in 1984, it is operated at the Pichi Richi Railway, Quorn, South Australia

From the 1930s, the diesel railcar made great progress and by the 1950s the railmotor was consigned to history. The diesel's ability to use multiple unit control was an advantage.

=== Heritage examples ===
==== United Kingdom ====
The Great Western Society, based at Didcot, has restored a Great Western Railway steam railmotor, built in 1908, to working condition. It regularly operates throughout the summer and has visited other preserved railways in the west country and Wales. It also operated on the mainline between Liskeard and Looe in November 2012.

A mostly complete example is a Midland Railway railmotor, which was later turned into an officers' saloon for inspection duties. It lasted in preservation from 1968 as a holiday home, then went to the National Railway Museum where inadequate outside storage led to its deterioration. It was later moved to a farm in 2015 and remains there as of May 2019.

In Northern Ireland, the heritage Downpatrick and County Down Railway (D&CDR) owns an example of a Belfast and County Down Railway railmotor which was converted to an autotrain driving trailer while in service. After withdrawal it was used as private accommodation in a field before being restored to working order. The D&CDR also has Great Southern and Western Railway No. 90, which was built in 1875 as a railmotor but had its carriage portion removed in 1915.

==== Australia ====
(In Australia, the term "railmotor" was used in those states, especially New South Wales, with a strongly British-influenced railway tradition. It was applied to diesel or petrol-powered self-propelled passenger carriages otherwise termed "railcars" on Australian railways where a more American tradition applied, such as the Commonwealth Railways and South Australian Railways. Examples of New South Wales railmotors were the 400 and 500 class and the CPH class "tin hares", and in Victoria the Walker railmotor. Similar vehicles in South Australia, the Brill Model 75, were termed "railcars".)

A 1905-vintage, British-built steam railmotor is operated on the Pichi Richi Railway: the former South Australian Railways Steam Motor Coach (SMC) no. 1, (Note: During brief ownership by the Commonwealth Railways, it was classified as NJAB 1.) the only example of its type operating in the world. The engine unit, built by Kitson and Company of Leeds, England, consists of a small saturated locomotive-type boiler and a cab fitted on a four-wheel (720 mm diameter) underframe. Two outside cylinders delivering 8.96 kN (2,015 lb_{f}) of tractive effort drive the rear axle, which is the only one powered; valve gear is Walschaerts. The coach unit, finished in dark oak-stained and varnished timber, was built by the Metropolitan Amalgamated Railway Carriage and Wagon Company of Birmingham. The first class compartment has elaborate pressed ceiling patterns and carpeted floor; second class has a plain ceiling and linoleum flooring. Seating is upholstered with mock leather; nine first class seats and thirteen second class are in separate compartments.

SMC no. 1 was nicknamed the "Coffee Pot" after railwaymen chalked "Coffee" and "Cocoa" on two water barrels that had been placed on the running boards on either side as a spare water supply; the term persists today.

The South Australian Railways inaugurated the vehicle in August 1906 on the narrow-gauge (Note: 1067 mm (3 ft 6 in) gauge.) Great Northern Division; a similar unit went to the South East Division. Its regular duty was a weekly trip to Hawker, 65 km (40 mi) away, hauling a four-wheel van to carry parcels and mail. It was hired for charter on weekends, often by tennis and football clubs. It spent its entire working life operating out of the Quorn locomotive depot until 1932, when it was stored and, later, publicly displayed at Port Augusta and Alice Springs. In 1975 it was returned to Quorn for restoration to working order by the Pichi Richi Railway Preservation Society. After extensive work, it was returned to service in 1984 and now operates at regular intervals.

== Fleets ==
Operator	Country	Introduction	Withdrawal	Quantity	
Barry Railway	Wales	1905	1914	2	They were de-engined and converted to bogie open composite carriages according diagram 14.
Belfast and County Down Railway	Ireland	1905	1959	3	Converted to autotrain carriages, then later conventional brake third. No. 2 is preserved at the Downpatrick and County Down Railway.
Bristol and Exeter Railway	England	1850	1851	1	See Bristol and Exeter Railway Fairfield steam carriage
Cape Government Railways	South Africa	1906	c. 1918	1	Built by NBL & Metropolitan Amalgamated Railway Carriage & Wagon
Cardiff Railway	Wales				
Central South African Railways	South Africa	1907	c. 1921	1	Built by Kitson & Metropolitan Amalgamated Railway Carriage & Wagon
Eastern Counties Railway	England	1847			
Furness Railway	England	1905	1918	2	Railmotor trailer No. 193 survives.
Great Central Railway	England	1904		3	
Great Northern Railway	England	1905	1927	6	
Great North of Scotland Railway	Scotland	1905	1909	2	One railmotor body saloon survives.
Great Southern and Western Railway	Ireland	1904	1915		
Great Western Railway	England	1903	1935	99	See GWR steam rail motors
Lancashire and Yorkshire Railway	England	1905	1948	20	L&YR railmotors used on the 'Altcar Bob' and other services
London and North Eastern Railway	England	1925	1948	80	Sentinel steam railcars
London and South Western Railway	England	1901	1903	15	
London Brighton and South Coast Railway	England	1905		2	
Midland Railway	England	1904	1907		Some turned into Officers' Saloons around 1907, but equipment was not removed until about 1917. No. 2234 survives in converted saloon condition.
New South Wales Government Railways	Australia	1923	1983	37	See CPH railmotor and Creamy Kate
Nidd Valley Light Railway	England	1921	1929	1	Ex-Great Western Railway
Northern Counties Committee	Ireland	1905	1913	2	
North Staffordshire Railway	England	1905	1927	3	
Port Talbot Railway	Wales	1906	1915	1	Sold to Port of London Authority, withdrawn 1926.
Rhymney Railway	Wales				
South African Railways	South Africa	1929		1	Built by Clayton Carriage and Wagon
South Australian Railways	Australia	1906–1932 then 1984–present (as of 2019)		2	South Australian Railways Steam Motor Coach no. 1 ("Coffee Pot") (briefly Commonwealth Railways NJAB 1) is operational on the Pichi Richi Railway. Wheel arrangement 2-2-0WT. Engine unit by Kitson & Co. of Leeds, England; coach by Metropolitan Amalgamated Railway Carriage and Wagon Co. of Birmingham.
South Eastern and Chatham Railway	England	1904		8	
Sri Lanka Railways	Sri Lanka	1904		1	
Taff Vale Railway	Wales			16	
Victorian Railways	Australia				See Victorian Railways railmotors.

== See also ==
- Autorail
- British steam railcars
- Railbus
- Railcar
- Motor coach
- Multiple unit
