= Altcar and Hillhouse railway station =

Disused railway station in Great Altcar, Lancashire

Altcar and Hillhouse
- Altcar and Hillhouse in 1949, looking south

General information
- Location: Great Altcar, West Lancashire; England
- Coordinates: 53.54748°N 2.98397°W
- Grid reference: SD349060
- Platforms: 2

Other information
- Status: Disused

History
- Original company: Southport & Cheshire Lines Extension Railway
- Pre-grouping: Cheshire Lines Committee
- Post-grouping: Cheshire Lines Committee

Key dates
- 1 September 1884: Station opened
- 1 January 1917: Station closed
- 1 April 1919: Station reopened
- 7 January 1952: Station closed to passengers
- 7 July 1952: Station closed to public goods services
- May 1960: Station closed completely
Location

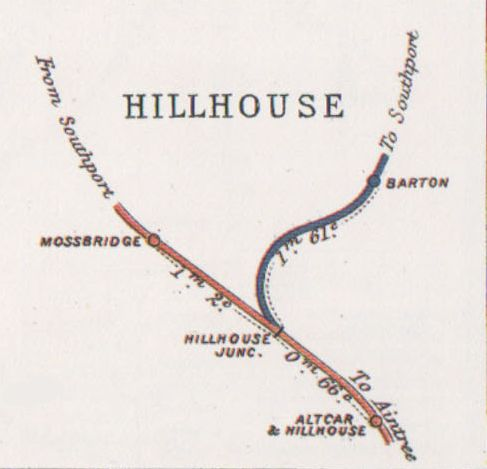
Hillhouse Junction, with Altcar and Hillhouse below

Altcar and Hillhouse was a railway station located on the Southport & Cheshire Lines Extension Railway near Great Altcar, Lancashire, England.

The station opened on 1 September 1884, and from 1887 to 1926 also served as the southern terminus of the Liverpool, Southport and Preston Junction Railway, which it connected with at Hillhouse Junction, between Altcar and Mossbridge. Thereafter, the southern terminus of the LSPJR regular services became Barton (or Downholland as it was occasionally known). The "Altcar Bob" service, introduced in July 1906, was so named because it terminated here until that time. Altcar and Hillhouse was situated on the south side of the B5195 road, near the sewage works.

== History ==
Along with all other stations on the extension line, Altcar and Hillhouse closed on 1 January 1917, as a World War I economy measure.

The station was reopened on 1 April 1919, and continued in use until 7 January 1952, when the SCLER was closed to passengers from Aintree Central to Southport Lord Street. The line remained open for public goods traffic until 7 July 1952 at Southport Lord Street, Birkdale Palace and Altcar & Hillhouse Stations. Public goods facilities were ended at Woodvale, Lydiate and Sefton & Maghull stations on the same date as passenger services (7 January 1952) and there were never any goods facilities at Ainsdale Beach station to begin with. After 7 July 1952, a siding remained open at Altcar & Hillhouse for private goods facilities until May 1960. The very last passenger train to run on the SCLER was a railway enthusiasts 'special' between Aintree and Altcar & Hillhouse railways stations on 6 June 1959.

As an ex Cheshire Lines Committee railway the line through Altcar & Hillhouse became a joint operation between the London, Midland and Scottish Railway and the London and North Eastern Railway following the Grouping of 1923.

The line then passed on to the London Midland Region of British Railways on nationalisation in 1948, before closure by British Railways on 7 July 1952.

== The site today ==
The station has been demolished. The route of the line through the station is today part of the Trans Pennine Trail.

Preceding station	Disused railways	Following station
Lydiate	Cheshire Lines Committee; Southport & Cheshire Lines Extension Railway	Mossbridge until 1917
Lydiate	Cheshire Lines Committee; Southport & Cheshire Lines Extension Railway	Woodvale from 1919
Lydiate	Liverpool, Southport and Preston Junction Railway; Barton Branch	Barton until 1926
