= Churchtown railway station =

Former railway station in England

Churchtown

General information
- Location: Churchtown, Sefton; England
- Coordinates: 53.661965°N 2.965384°W
- Grid reference: SD36301882
- Platforms: 2

Other information
- Status: Disused

History
- Original company: West Lancashire Railway
- Pre-grouping: Lancashire and Yorkshire Railway
- Post-grouping: London, Midland and Scottish Railway

Key dates
- 20 February 1878: Opened
- 7 September 1964: Closed
Location

Churchtown railway station was on the West Lancashire Railway in England. It opened in 1878 and served the Southport suburb of Churchtown.

== History ==
The station opened on 20 February 1878 when the West Lancashire Railway (WLR) opened the first section of its railway between Hesketh Park and Hesketh Bank and Tarleton. The station was used the day before the public opening for the official celebration of the opening of the line.

The railway ran on an embankment, and crossed what is now Cambridge Road on an iron bridge. The station was on the east side of the road with the booking office situated at street level, on the westbound side of the station, roughly where Churchtown Medical Centre stands today. The eastbound platform was reached by an under-pass from the booking office, steps were located on both sides of the lines to get up to platform level.

There were two platforms of wooden construction, one each side of the running lines, each had a waiting room also of wooden construction. In 1899 the timber platforms were renewed. By 1928 the steps up to the Southport bound platform had been replaced by a steep ramp making life hard for the porters until a powered truck was provided.

No goods yard or facilities, although Hindle (2022) suggests that locally caught fish were despatched from here.

== Electrification ==
The Lancashire and Yorkshire Railway (L&YR) absorbed the WLR in 1897, by this time the railway was attracting a fair amount of commuter traffic. The L&YR decided to meet this demand by extending its electric train service that had started running between Liverpool and Southport in March 1904. The electrified service started on 5 April 1904. From this date, travellers from Churchtown station used both electric and steam-hauled trains.

From 1924 some of the services were operated using twelve 45 ft (14 m) lightweight composite single power cars, usually known as orange boxes, that had been built for the Southport to Dingle service over the Liverpool Overhead Railway and had become redundant when that service was withdrawn in 1914, they were then used on the Gladstone Dock local service until 1924 when that ceased, they could still be seen on the Crossens service as late as 1945.

== Closure ==
The station closed when the line ceased operations on 7 September 1964, the platforms were demolished and the track through the station site was lifted in March 1965. The bridge was dismantled during 1965 and the embankments on either side removed soon afterwards.

Preceding station	Disused railways	Following station
Hesketh Park towards Southport	West Lancashire Railway	Crossens towards Preston

== Bibliography ==
- Cotterall, J.E. (1982). The West Lancashire Railway. Oakwood.
- Gahan, John W. (1982). Seventeen Stations to Dingle: the Liverpool Overhead Railway remembered. ISBN 0-907768-20-2.
- Hindle, David John (2022). Lament for a Branch Line: The Preston to Southport Railway (2nd Enlarged ed.). Silver Link Books. ISBN 978 1 85794 609 3.
- Hurst, Geoffrey (1992). Register of Closed Railways: 1948-1991. Worksop, Nottinghamshire: Milepost Publications. ISBN 0-9477-9618-5.
- Marsden, Colin (2008). The DC Electrics. Hersham: Oxford Publishing. ISBN 978-0-86093-615-2.
- The Railway Clearing House (1970) [1904]. The Railway Clearing House Handbook of Railway Stations 1904 (1970 D&C Reprint ed.). Newton Abbot: David & Charles Reprints. ISBN 0-7153-5120-6.
- Quick, Michael (2023) [2001]. Railway passenger stations in Great Britain: a chronology (PDF). version 5.05. Railway & Canal Historical Society.
