= Hundred End railway station =

Former railway station in England

Hundred End

General information
- Location: West Lancashire; England
- Coordinates: 53.6922°N 2.8823°W
- Grid reference: SD 419 221
- Platforms: 2

Other information
- Status: Disused

History
- Original company: West Lancashire Railway
- Pre-grouping: Lancashire and Yorkshire Railway
- Post-grouping: London, Midland and Scottish Railway

Key dates
- by July 1878: Opened as Hundred End Gate House
- by 1883: renamed as Hundred End for Mere Brow and Holmes
- 1899: renamed as Hundred End
- 3 June 1957: Closed to goods traffic
- 30 April 1962: Closed to passengers
- 7 September 1964: Line closed
Location

Hundred End railway station was on the West Lancashire Railway in England. It served the small community of Hundred End, named after the boundary between the Leyland Hundred and West Derby Hundred where the village was located. The station was known locally as ‘Celery Junction’ due to the amount of farm produce that departed from it.

== Opening ==
The line between Hesketh Park on the outskirts of Southport and Hesketh Bank which ran through the station site was opened on 20 February 1878.

The station had opened as Hundred End Gate House by July 1878 when it first appeared in Bradshaw's Guide. Sometime in 1882 or 1883 the station was renamed to Hundred End for Mere Brow and Holmes and then, from 1899, in Bradshaw's Guide it was shown as Hundred End for Mere Brow.

The railway had authority through its Act to compulsory purchase the land the station was built on, and perhaps because Sir Thomas G. Fermor Hesketh was a director of the company the land was not purchased, Sir Thomas giving the land to the railway in 1894.

In 1897 the Lancashire and Yorkshire Railway (L&YR) absorbed the West Lancashire Railway and in 1899 they dropped the suffix in their timetables, the station therefore becoming Hundred End.

== Location ==
The station was located where Hundred End Lane/Taylor's Meanygate crossed the railway, the road was crossed with a level crossing. (Note: Hundred End Lane and Taylor's Meanygate are the same road, Hundred End Lane is to the north and it runs into Taylor's Meanygate somewhere around where the station was situated, slightly north of where Boudary Lane intersects them.)

The station was approximately 2 miles (3.2 km) to the north of Holmes and 2 1/2 miles (4.0 km) from Mere Brow.

== Description ==
When it opened the station had no buildings and only two short platforms, one on each side of the double track. By 1895 a signal box had been built adjacent to the level-crossing. Behind the signal box but attached to it was the booking office which passengers accessed through a hatch from the road side. These buildings were all of wooden construction as were two simple waiting shelters one on each platform, the platforms were illuminated, dimly, by oil lamps. There were two goods sidings with a loading platform to the north of the running lines on the Preston side of the level crossing.

At its closure the platforms were still being described as 'cinder', the station having a wooden hut containing a wooden bench on each platform, there was a large notice board and nothing else, the station was still gas-lit by half-a-dozen lamps.

In 1884 the station was a 'request' stop whereby passengers had to signal the train to stop, there were 10 'down' services, towards Preston and 13 'up' services towards Southport Central.

== Closure ==
The station closed to goods traffic on 3 June 1957, significantly the reason given for the closure was the switch of market gardeners and farmers to road transport, and closed to passengers on 30 April 1962.

Trains continued passing through the station until the line was closed on 7 September 1964.

== Accidents ==
On Sunday 13 January 1901 a station porter was involved in an accident at the station that caused him several injuries including the loss of a leg.

A fatal accident occurred at the station's level crossing on 1 June 1940 when a passenger crossing the line, having used a wicket gate, was struck by the locomotive. Her heel had caught in the tracks.

Preceding station	Disused railways	Following station
Banks towards Southport	West Lancashire Railway	Hesketh Bank towards Preston

== Bibliography ==
- Biddle, Gordon (1990). The Railway Surveyors. London: Allan. ISBN 978-0-7110-1954-6.
- Clinker, C. R. (October 1978). Clinker's Register of Closed Passenger Stations and Goods Depots in England, Scotland and Wales 1830–1977. Bristol: Avon-Anglia Publications & Services. ISBN 0-905466-19-5. OCLC 5726624.
- Cotterall, J.E. (1982). The West Lancashire Railway. Oakwood.
- Daniels, G.; Dench, L.A. (n.d.). Passengers No More. Ian Allan.
- Greenhalgh, Malcolm (2009). Ribble, valley and river : a local and natural history. Carnegie.
- Hindle, David John (2022). Lament for a Branch Line: The Preston to Southport Railway (2nd Enlarged ed.). Silver Link Books. ISBN 978 1 85794 609 3.
- Hurst, Geoffrey (1992). Register of Closed Railways: 1948-1991. Worksop, Nottinghamshire: Milepost Publications. ISBN 0-9477-9618-5.
- Quick, Michael (2023) [2001]. Railway passenger stations in Great Britain: a chronology (PDF). version 5.05. Railway & Canal Historical Society.
- Suggitt, Gordon (2004) [2003]. Lost Railways of Lancashire (Reprinted from 2003 original with revisions ed.). Newbury: Countryside Books. ISBN 978-1-85306-801-0.
