= Crossens railway station =

Former railway station in England

Crossens

General information
- Location: Sefton; England
- Coordinates: 53.666434°N 2.951245°W
- Grid reference: SD37241930
- Platforms: 2

Other information
- Status: Disused

History
- Original company: West Lancashire Railway
- Pre-grouping: Lancashire and Yorkshire Railway
- Post-grouping: London, Midland and Scottish Railway

Key dates
- 20 February 1878: Opened
- 6 April 1964: Closed to goods
- 7 September 1964: Closed to passengers
Location

Crossens railway station was a railway station serving Crossens, a suburb of Southport, Sefton, Merseyside, England.

== History ==
The station opened on 20 February 1878 when the West Lancashire Railway (WLR) opened the first section of its railway between Hesketh Park and Hesketh Bank.

== Description ==
The station was located on the east side of where Rufford Road and Bankfield Lane connected and crossed the railway on an over-bridge. (Note: Rufford Road and Bankfield Lane are the same road, one ran into the other approximately where the road crossed the railway, it's now the B5244.)

There were two platforms, one each side of the railway, accessed by ramps down from the road, later stairways were provided down from the over-bridge.

The station building was a single-storey brick building on the north-west side of the double-track running lines, at the back of the Preston bound platform. The other platform had simple brick built waiting shelter.

Sometime between 1912 and 1928 a footbridge was installed at the southern end of the platforms.

On the south-eastern side of the railway was a small goods yard with a goods shed and behind that was the WLR carriage sheds. By 1911 further freight sidings had been installed on the opposite side of the running lines.

== Electrification ==
The Lancashire and Yorkshire Railway (L&YR) absorbed the WLR in 1897, by this time Crossens had grown into an outlying residential district of Southport which resulted in the railway attracting a lot of commuter traffic. The L&YR decided to meet this demand by extending its electric train service that had started running between Liverpool and Southport in March 1904. The electrified service started on 5 April 1904.

Initially trains that ran to Crossens were non-stop from Liverpool to Southport then called at all stations between Southport and Crossens.

All the electric services arrived at Crossens in the Preston bound platform, set down their passengers then continued for a short distance to a cross-over where the driver changed ends and drove back into the station into the Southport bound platform.

From 1924 some of the services were operated using twelve 45 ft (14 m) lightweight composite single power cars, usually known as orange boxes, that had been built for the Southport to Dingle service over the Liverpool Overhead Railway and had become redundant when that service was withdrawn in 1914, they were then used on the Gladstone Dock local service until 1924 when that ceased, they could still be seen on the Crossens service as late as 1945.

== The Tarleton railmotor ==
On 3 June 1912 the L&YR introduced a railmotor service using Crossens as the southern terminus and running to Hesketh Bank and then taking the Tarleton Branch to two new halts. The service operated seven trains per day, except on Sundays when there was no service. The signalling at the station needed modification for this service as it was operated in such a way that the railmotor would draw into the north end of the Southport bound platform where an electric train would already be waiting at the south end. This allowed passengers from the railmotor to walk a short distance along the same platform to join the train to Southport. The service was not a success and was withdrawn on 1 October 1913.

== Services ==
By the summer of 1910 Crossens had 44 weekday electric services to Southport, these ran as shuttles and therefore involved a change at Southport for services towards Liverpool. There were also 17 steam hauled daily trains to Southport and 17 in the other direction to Preston, Accrington, Todmorden and the East Lancashire District.

== Closure ==
The station closed to goods traffic on 6 April 1964 and to passengers on 7 September 1964 with the closure of the line north of Meols Cop.

The track through the station site had been lifted by April 1965, the station was demolished in the late 1960s and the site redeveloped firstly as an industrial and then by 2006 as a residential area.

Preceding station	Disused railways	Following station
Churchtown towards Southport	West Lancashire Railway	Banks towards Preston

== See also ==
Lancashire and Yorkshire Railway railmotors

== Bibliography ==
- Bradshaw, George (1968) [April 1910]. April 1910 Railway Guide. Newton Abbot: David & Charles. ISBN 978-0-7153-4246-6. OCLC 30645.
- Clinker, C. R. (October 1978). Clinker's Register of Closed Passenger Stations and Goods Depots in England, Scotland and Wales 1830–1977. Bristol: Avon-Anglia Publications & Services. ISBN 0-905466-19-5. OCLC 5726624.
- Gahan, John W. (1982). Seventeen Stations to Dingle: the Liverpool Overhead Railway remembered. ISBN 0-907768-20-2.
- Hindle, David John (2022). Lament for a Branch Line: The Preston to Southport Railway (2nd Enlarged ed.). Silver Link Books. ISBN 978 1 85794 609 3.
- Hurst, Geoffrey (1992). Register of Closed Railways: 1948-1991. Worksop, Nottinghamshire: Milepost Publications. ISBN 0-9477-9618-5.
- Marsden, Colin (2008). The DC Electrics. Hersham: Oxford Publishing. ISBN 978-0-86093-615-2.
- Quick, Michael (2023) [2001]. Railway passenger stations in Great Britain: a chronology (PDF). version 5.05. Railway & Canal Historical Society.
- Wright, Paul (2011). Lost Stations of North West England. Disused Stations: Closed Railway Stations in the UK. ISBN 978-1-85794-371-9.
