= Banks railway station =

Disused railway station in Banks, Lancashire

Banks
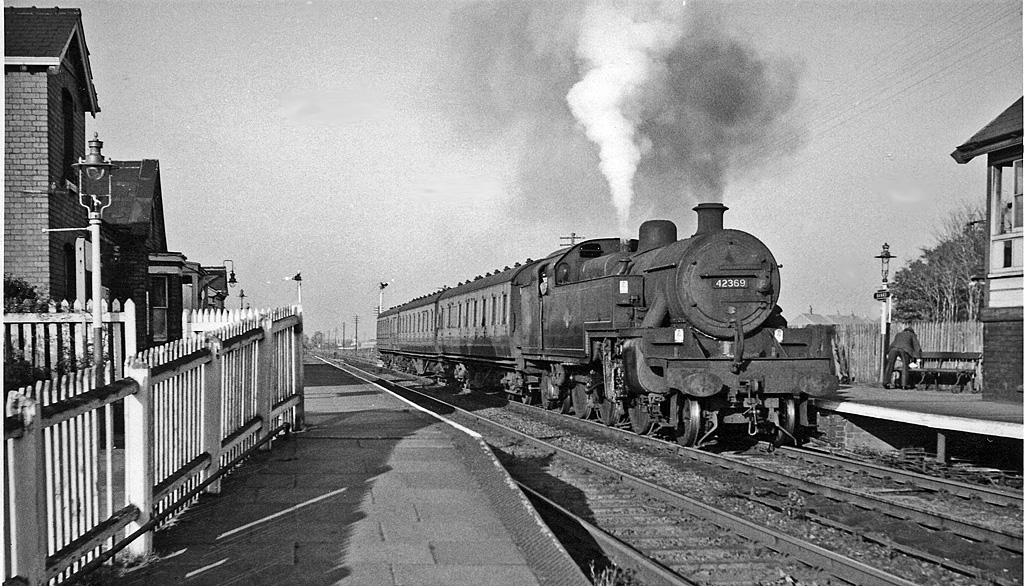
- Banks railway station in 1964

General information
- Location: Banks, West Lancashire; England
- Coordinates: 53.677401°N 2.92304°W
- Platforms: 2

Other information
- Status: Disused

History
- Original company: West Lancashire Railway
- Pre-grouping: Lancashire and Yorkshire Railway
- Post-grouping: London, Midland and Scottish Railway

Key dates
- 20 February 1878: Opened
- 6 April 1964: Closed to goods
- 7 September 1964: Closed to passengers
Location

Banks railway station was on the West Lancashire Railway in England. It served the village of Banks near Southport.

== Opening ==
The station opened on 20 February 1878. The station was used the day before the public opening for the official celebration of the opening of the line. On that day, the first passenger train was greeted at Banks by "simple songs" from the Church School children. The vicar of Banks, a passenger on the train, rewarded them with a "shower of coppers".

Mrs. Mary Wignall of Ralph's Wife's Lane was interviewed by a local newspaper reporter in 1958 when she was 93 and the oldest resident in Banks. She said, "I well remember watching the first train pass through the village with scores of school children lining the route catching pastries, cakes and oranges thrown from windows".

== Description ==
The station was located where Hoole Lane/Guinea Lane (now Guinea Hall Lane) crossed the line protected by a level-crossing.

There were two platforms, one each side of the running lines, the station building was on the north side of the tracks at the back of the platform. It was a substantial building with a booking office, waiting room and station-masters residence, on the Southport bound platform was the signal box for the level-crossing and a wooden waiting shelter.

The goods yard was located to the north-west of the station, it consisted of a few sidings and was able to accommodate most types of goods including live stock and was equipped with a five ton crane. There was a goods shed and loading platform in 1894 but the shed had been removed by 1912.

== Closure ==
The station closed to goods traffic on 6 April 1964 and to passengers on 7 September 1964 when the line closed. The station has been demolished, a drainage ditch occupies the site of one platform and the other forms the route of a bridleway.

Preceding station	Disused railways	Following station
Crossens towards Southport	West Lancashire Railway	Hundred End towards Preston

== Bibliography ==
- Clinker, C. R. (October 1978). Clinker's Register of Closed Passenger Stations and Goods Depots in England, Scotland and Wales 1830–1977. Bristol: Avon-Anglia Publications & Services. ISBN 0-905466-19-5. OCLC 5726624.
- Cotterall, J.E. (1982). The West Lancashire Railway. Oakwood.
- Hindle, David John (2022). Lament for a Branch Line: The Preston to Southport Railway (2nd Enlarged ed.). Silver Link Books. ISBN 978 1 85794 609 3.
- Hurst, Geoffrey (1992). Register of Closed Railways: 1948-1991. Worksop, Nottinghamshire: Milepost Publications. ISBN 0-9477-9618-5.
- Quick, Michael (2023) [2001]. Railway passenger stations in Great Britain: a chronology (PDF). version 5.05. Railway & Canal Historical Society.
- The Railway Clearing House (1970) [1904]. The Railway Clearing House Handbook of Railway Stations 1904 (1970 D&C Reprint ed.). Newton Abbot: David & Charles Reprints. ISBN 0-7153-5120-6.
