= St Luke's railway station =

Former railway station in England

St Luke's
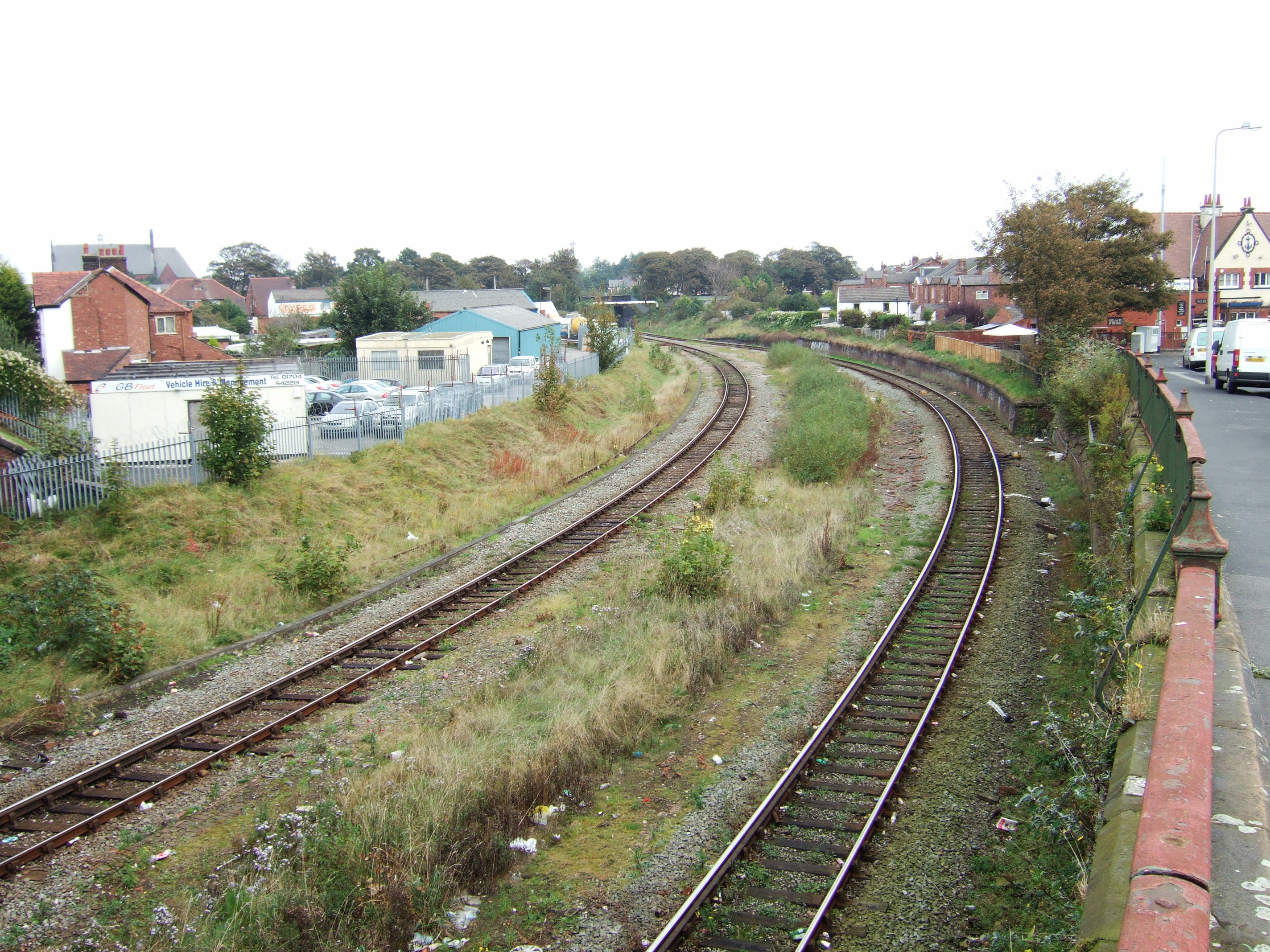
- The present-day site of St Luke's railway station. The gap between the tracks shows where the Preston platform used to stand.

General information
- Location: Southport, Sefton; England
- Coordinates: 53.64348°N 2.988238°W
- Grid reference: SD34771678
- Platforms: 4

Other information
- Status: Disused

History
- Original company: Lancashire and Yorkshire Railway
- Pre-grouping: Lancashire and Yorkshire Railway
- Post-grouping: London, Midland and Scottish Railway

Key dates
- 1 July 1883: Opened as Barton Street
- October 1883: Renamed Southport St Lukes Road
- 1 March 1902: Renamed Southport St Lukes
- May 1914: Renamed St Lukes
- 8 September 1968: Closed
Location

St Luke's railway station was a railway station in Southport, Merseyside.

The station originally served trains on the Lancashire and Yorkshire Railway's Wigan to Southport line but was modified and extended in 1902 to incorporate Southport Ash Street station on the former West Lancashire Railway.

== Original station ==
The line through the station site was opened on 9 April 1855 when the Manchester and Southport Railway, a line jointly owned by the Lancashire and Yorkshire Railway (L&YR) and the East Lancashire Railway (ELR), was extended into Southport.

The station was opened on 1 July 1883 as Barton Street by the L&YR, who by then had absorbed the ELR. It was renamed as Southport St Luke's Road in October 1883. (Note: The Ordnance Survey always used Luke's with an apostrophy, and it was so named in the Handbook of Railway Stations but there was no apostrophy on the station nameboards.)

The station was situated on the east side of Ash Street/St Luke's Road where it crossed the L&YR Wigan & Southport line on an over-bridge. (Note: Ash Street and St Luke's Road are the same road, one runs into the other and they join somewhere in the vicinity of the rail overbridges, Ash Street is to the south, St Luke's Road to the north, yet Ash Street station is north of St Luke's station. The modern name is Rose Hill with St Luke's Road to its north and Ash Street to the south.) The station consisted of an island platform with running lines either side, there was an additional running line on the north side without a platform. Access to the platform was via a footbridge across the lines from the road overbridge then down a stairway at the western end of the platform. The booking office and waiting rooms were located in the centre of the platform. The station had no goods facilities but there were two sidings to the south of the station belonging to the Municipal Highways Department.

In December 1895 the station had weekday services as follows:

- 21 services to Wigan Wallgate of which 13 continue to Manchester Victoria, 7 of these go via Atherton and one via Prestwich.
- 13 services to Ormskirk via Burscough of which 9 continued to Liverpool Exchange, two continued to Colne and one to Glasgow Central.

== Enlarged station ==
In 1897 the L&YR absorbed the West Lancashire Railway (WLR), the Liverpool, Southport and Preston Junction Railway (LS&PJR) and the L&YR found itself with two stations situated very close together, one either side of the road over-bridge, St Lukes to the south with its platform on the eastern side of the road, and the former WLR's Southport Ash Street station to the north with its platforms to the west of the road.

The L&YR rebuilt the stations, moving Ash Street services to the eastern side of the road and providing a new booking office. As the rebuilding was underway, on 1 March 1902, the station was renamed as Southport St Luke's, the new platforms on the former WLR and LS&PJR lines opened in March 1902, although they were still being called Southport Ash Street. (Note: There is some confusion over the dates of work completing, name changes and operations starting between the closing of Ash Street and the alterations of St Luke's and somewhere in between the provision of temporary facilities.)

The ticket office for the enlarged station was located on the over-bridge between the two sets of running lines. It was a single-storey brick built building with a high pitch roof. Access to the platforms was via a covered footbridge behind the booking office leading to two stairways down to the western end of each island platform. Each platform had wooden waiting facilities. The two platforms were almost at right angles to each other, separated by Hart Street.

On 22 March 1904 the former WLR Preston line through the station was electrified as part of an extension of electric services from Southport to Crossens. In May 1914, the station was renamed St Luke's.

In July 1922 the station had weekday services as follows;

- 10 services to Barton of which four continued on to Altcar and Hillhouse, these were operated using railmotors, the service was colloqually known as the Altcar Bob.
- 48 services to Crossens, all except one of which went via Meols Cop where they reversed, the odd one went direct.
- 24 services to Wigan Wallgate of which 18 continue to Manchester Victoria.
- 13 services to Ormskirk via Burscough.
- 19 services on the former WLR, mostly going to Preston, but one to Todmorden and one to Accrington, one train also had through carriages to Glasgow.

== Decline and closure ==
The former LS&PJR line closed to passengers on 26 September 1938 with the exception of the section of track from the former WLR through Meols Cop station to Butts Lane Junction where a connection had been made in 1911 to the main Southport to Wigan line at Pool Hey Junction.This line is still open and now forms the Wigan to Southport route which still runs through the site of the station.

Ormskirk to Southport services were withdrawn on 5 March 1962.

Trains to Preston (including the Crossens electric shuttle) ended when the former WLR line was closed on 7 September 1964, a victim of the Beeching Axe.

The direct line through the station to Wigan then closed on 14 June 1965 with trains being diverted via Meols Cop, Butts Lane Junction and Pool Hey Junction to allow the closure of the busy level crossing at Blowick. The Wigan platforms closed at this time. The island platform was completely razed, and the space under St Luke's Bridge filled in.

The Preston platforms and the station closed on 8 September 1968.

Today, the site of the Wigan platforms have been built over with a modern housing development, but the tracks widen at a point where the Preston platform used to stand and can be clearly seen by passing trains."Site of St Luke's railway station" (Map). Google Maps.

Preceding station	Historical railways	Following station
Southport Chapel Street	Lancashire and Yorkshire Railway; Liverpool, Southport and Preston Junction Railway	Meols Cop
Southport Chapel Street	Lancashire and Yorkshire Railway; Southport-Crossens electric service	Meols Cop
	Disused railways	
Southport Chapel Street	Lancashire and Yorkshire Railway; Manchester and Southport Railway	Blowick (until 1939)
Southport Chapel Street	Lancashire and Yorkshire Railway; Manchester and Southport Railway	Bescar Lane (from 1939)
Southport Chapel Street	Lancashire and Yorkshire Railway; West Lancashire Railway	Hesketh Park

== Bibliography ==
- Beeching, Richard (1963). "The Reshaping of British Railways" (PDF). HMSO.
- Bradshaw, George (2011) [December 1895]. Bradshaw's Rail Times for Great Britain and Ireland December 1895: A Reprint of the Classic Timetable Complete with Period Advertisements and Shipping Connections to All Parts. Midhurst: Middleton Press. ISBN 978-1-908174-11-6. OCLC 832579861.
- Bradshaw, George (1985) [July 1922]. Bradshaw's General Railway and Steam Navigation guide for Great Britain and Ireland: A reprint of the July 1922 issue. Newton Abbot: David & Charles. ISBN 978-0-7153-8708-5. OCLC 12500436.
- Bolger, Paul (1994). Merseyside and District Railway Stations. The Bluecoat Press.
- Brown, Joe (2021). Liverpool & Manchester Railway Atlas. Manchester: Crécy Publishing. ISBN 9780860936879. OCLC 1112373294.
- Grant, Donald J. (2017). Directory of the Railway Companies of Great Britain (1st ed.). Kibworth Beauchamp, Leicestershire: Troubador Publishing Ltd. ISBN 978-1-78803-768-6.
- Hindle, David John (2022). Lament for a Branch Line: The Preston to Southport Railway (2nd Enlarged ed.). Silver Link Books. ISBN 978 1 85794 609 3.
- Hurst, Geoffrey (1992). Register of Closed Railways: 1948-1991. Worksop, Nottinghamshire: Milepost Publications. ISBN 0-9477-9618-5.
- Marsden, Colin (2008). The DC Electrics. Hersham: Oxford Publishing. ISBN 978-0-86093-615-2.
- Marshall, John (1969). The Lancashire & Yorkshire Railway. Vol. 1. Newton Abbot: David & Charles. ISBN 978-0-7153-4352-4.
- Marshall, John (1981). Forgotten Railways:North-West England. David & Charles. ISBN 0-7153-8003-6.
- Quick, Michael (2023) [2001]. Railway passenger stations in Great Britain: a chronology (PDF). version 5.05. Railway & Canal Historical Society.
- Taylor, Stuart (1995). Journey by Excursion Train from East Lancashire - Part One - Colne, Nelson, Burnley, Accrington & Blackburn. Scenes from the Past. Vol. 26 (part one). Foxline. ISBN 978-1-870119-84-9.
- The Railway Clearing House (1970) [1904]. The Railway Clearing House Handbook of Railway Stations 1904 (1970 D&C Reprint ed.). Newton Abbot: David & Charles Reprints. ISBN 0-7153-5120-6.
