= River Douglas railway station =

Former railway station in England

River Douglas

General information
- Location: West Lancashire; England
- Coordinates: 53.69873°N 2.83382°W
- Grid reference: SD450228
- Platforms: 2

Other information
- Status: Disused

History
- Original company: West Lancashire Railway

Key dates
- 1 August 1878: Opened
- 25 April 1889: Last known train
- 27 March 1890: Last seen in timetable but without trains
Location

River Douglas railway station was a railway station on the West Lancashire Railway (WLR) in North West England, which served as an interchange for transfers of passengers and goods between the River Douglas and the railway.

== History ==
River Douglas railway station opened on 1 August 1878 when the West Lancashire Railway (WLR) extended its line by 15 chains (990 ft; 300 m) from Hesketh Bank to the western bank of the River Douglas where the station was located. (Note: Railways in the United Kingdom are, for historical reasons, measured in miles and chains. A chain is 22 yards (20 m) long, there are 80 chains to the mile. Occasionally furlongs are also used, there are 10 chains to the furlong.) (Note: The River Douglas is also known as the River Asland.)

== Description ==
The station was inspected by a Board of Trade inspector on 13 July 1878 and was authorised to open subject to a clock and nameboards being erected. When it opened the station was the northern terminus of the WLR but it was built as a through station in anticipation of the line being extended over the river once the swing-bridge was open.

The station had two platforms one either side of the line's double tracks. There was a small building on each platform, presumably waiting shelters. At the river end of each platform steps led down to a small wharf and then onto a landing stage to the north of the railway.

There was a single track goods siding to the north of the passenger station, this was the line that ran onto the temporary bridge and was used for goods transfers from river traffic. By 1893 there were two sidings and by 1911 there were two more sidings in the brickworks.

Once the swing bridge was open, and the temporary structure dismantled the landing stage on the west bank was used for both goods and passengers.

== Passenger service ==
In 1878 and 1879 a 'special express' train service was run to the station from Southport Windsor Road only for excursions on the WLR's paddle steamer Virginia operating from the landing stage adjacent to the station, the excursions were to Lytham or just cruises to Naze Point in the River Ribble.

The passenger service from the landing stage lasted two seasons 1878 and 1879 with the last advertised services on the 29 and 30 August 1879. The season had made a financial loss and the service was withdrawn.

The WLR ran 14 trains through the station in each direction when it opened throughout in 1882. Bradshaw (1882) notes that none of the services were scheduled to stop but all trains were marked as requestable by signalling the train to stop, or informing the guard if wishing to alight.

== Goods service ==
The railway had a working relationship with the Leeds and Liverpool Canal company from the beginning, coal and other goods would travel by canal and then be transferred at the temporary bridge onto railway wagons. Once the landing stage adjacent to River Douglas station was completed and the temporary bridge removed it was used for the transfers.

In March 1879 the WLR started to ship coal along the canal and onto the River Douglas in its own steam barges, it had five of these in operation by November 1879, these were supplemented by privately owned barges when required.

On both sides of the railway as it approached the river there was a brickworks, originally the Ainsdale & Skelmersdale Brick and Tile Company, but they went bankrupt in 1880, and later Alty's Brick and Tile Company

The location was ideal for a brickworks as the river bank was boulder clay, the base material for brickmaking, and it had transport links by canal, river and rail where they had their own sidings with direct access to the railway.

== Closure ==
The station was last seen in timetables on 25 April 1889, after which services would no longer stop on request. The station had been removed by 1893.

In 1913 the swing bridge was fixed as commercial tall ships had ceased to use the River Douglas and the smaller canal craft could fit under the closed bridge.

The line closed on 7 September 1964 a casualty of the programme of closures advocated by the Beeching Report.

Preceding station	Disused railways	Following station
Hesketh Bank towards Southport	West Lancashire Railway	Hoole towards Preston

== Bibliography ==
- Beeching, Richard (1963). "The Reshaping of British Railways" (PDF). HMSO.
- Bradshaw, George (1882). Bradshaw's General Railway and Steam Navigation Guide, for Great Britain and Ireland (PDF). Manchester: Henry Blacklock.
- Dixon, John; Gilmour, John (March 2002). "West Lancashire Railway Mysteries Unravelled" (PDF). Railway and Canal Historical Society Journal. 34 Part 1 (181): 4–16. Archived from the original (PDF) on 20 January 2025.
- Fairhurst, Graham J. (n.d.). "Shipping on the River Douglas: A Short History of Maritime Activity on the River Douglas (or Asland) at Hesketh Bank and Tarleton". Tarleton and Hesketh Bank Village Website. Archived from the original on 25 April 2015.
- Fairhurst, Graham J. (n.d.). "A Short History of Brick Making at Hesketh Bank". Tarleton and Hesketh Bank Village Website. Archived from the original on 21 April 2017.
- Hadfield, Charles; Biddle, Gordon (1970). The Canals of North West England. The Canals of the British Isles. Vol. 1. Newton Abbot: David & Charles. ISBN 0 7153 4956 2.
- Hindle, David John (2022). Lament for a Branch Line: The Preston to Southport Railway (2nd Enlarged ed.). Silver Link Books. ISBN 978 1 85794 609 3.
- Hurst, Geoffrey (1992). Register of Closed Railways: 1948-1991. Worksop, Nottinghamshire: Milepost Publications. ISBN 0-9477-9618-5.
- Jacobs, Gerald (2009). "Railway Mileages". In Bridge, Mike (ed.). TRACKatlas of Mainland Britain. Bradford on Avon: Trackmaps. ISBN 978-0-9549866-5-0.
- Marshall, John (1969). The Lancashire & Yorkshire Railway. Vol. 1. Newton Abbot: David & Charles. ISBN 978-0-7153-4352-4.
- Quick, Michael (2023) [2001]. Railway passenger stations in Great Britain: a chronology (PDF). version 5.05. Railway & Canal Historical Society.
