= Hesketh Park railway station =

Former railway station in England

Hesketh Park

General information
- Location: Churchtown, Sefton; England
- Coordinates: 53.655113°N 2.978847°W
- Grid reference: SD35401807
- Platforms: 2

Other information
- Status: Disused

History
- Original company: West Lancashire Railway
- Pre-grouping: Lancashire and Yorkshire Railway
- Post-grouping: London, Midland and Scottish Railway

Key dates
- 20 February 1878: Opened
- 7 September 1964: Closed to passengers
- 27 November 1967: Closed to goods
Location

Hesketh Park railway station was on the West Lancashire Railway in England. It opened in 1878 and served the Southport suburb of Hesketh Park.

== History ==
=== Opening ===
The station opened on 20 February 1878 as its southern terminus when the West Lancashire Railway (WLR) opened the first section of its railway between here and Hesketh Bank and Tarleton. The station was used the day before the public opening when it hosted the ceremony for the official opening of the line.

=== Description ===
The station was located to the south of where Peet's lane crossed the line protected by a level-crossing. Road access was via a drive leading off Park Avenue and there was a footpath from Roe Lane leading to the Southport bound platform. The station was named after the nearby Hesketh Park.

The station was built by Bridge & Co. of Burscough. the platform surface was made of tiles instead of the usual asphalt, it was considered at the time to be an improvement.

There were two platforms, one each side of the running lines, the station building was on the north side of the tracks at the back of the platform. It was a substantial building of brick and stone construction with a booking office and waiting rooms. On the Southport bound platform was a waiting shelter.

The station became a through station when the line was extended southwards to a temporary station at Southport Windsor Road which opened on 10 June 1878.

By 1928 a footbridge had been provided between the platforms.

The goods yard was located to the north-west of the station, it consisted of a few sidings with a goods shed, the yard was able to accommodate most types of goods including live stock.

An engine shed was located at the station but closed when the station became a through station, and was demolished by the following year.

=== Electrification ===
The Lancashire and Yorkshire Railway (L&YR) absorbed the WLR in 1897, by this time the railway was attracting a fair amount of commuter traffic. The L&YR decided to meet this demand by extending its electric train service that had started running between Liverpool and Southport in March 1904. The electrified service started on 5 April 1904. From this date, travellers from Hesketh Park station used both electric and steam-hauled trains.

From 1924 some of the services were operated using twelve 45 ft (14 m) lightweight composite single power cars, usually known as orange boxes, that had been built for the Southport to Dingle service over the Liverpool Overhead Railway and had become redundant when that service was withdrawn in 1914, they were then used on the Gladstone Dock local service until 1924 when that ceased, they could still be seen on the Crossens service as late as 1945.

=== Closure ===
The station closed to passengers when the line ceased operations on 7 September 1964, having been steam operated until the end.

Freight traffic continued to a coal siding at the station until 27 November 1967. Track was lifted in late 1968.

| Preceding station | Disused railways | Following station |
|---|---|---|
| Southport Ash Street towards Southport | West Lancashire Railway until 1902 | Churchtown towards Preston |
| St Luke's towards Southport | Lancashire and Yorkshire Railway; West Lancashire Line from 1902 | Churchtown towards Preston |
| Meols Cop towards Southport | Lancashire and Yorkshire Railway; Southport-Crossens electric service | Churchtown towards Crossens |

== Bibliography ==
- Cotterall, J.E. (1982). The West Lancashire Railway. Oakwood. ISBN 0-85361-288-9.
- Gahan, John W. (1982). Seventeen Stations to Dingle: the Liverpool Overhead Railway remembered. ISBN 0-907768-20-2.
- Hindle, David John (2022). Lament for a Branch Line: The Preston to Southport Railway (2nd Enlarged ed.). Silver Link Books. ISBN 978 1 85794 609 3.
- Hurst, Geoffrey (1992). Register of Closed Railways: 1948-1991. Worksop, Nottinghamshire: Milepost Publications. ISBN 0-9477-9618-5.
- Marsden, Colin (2008). The DC Electrics. Hersham: Oxford Publishing. ISBN 978-0-86093-615-2.
- Marshall, John (1981). North-West England. Forgotten Railways. Vol. 9. David & Charles. ISBN 0-7153-8003-6.
- Quick, Michael (2023) [2001]. Railway passenger stations in Great Britain: a chronology (PDF). version 5.05. Railway & Canal Historical Society.
- The Railway Clearing House (1970) [1904]. The Railway Clearing House Handbook of Railway Stations 1904 (1970 D&C Reprint ed.). Newton Abbot: David & Charles Reprints. ISBN 0-7153-5120-6.
