= Longton Bridge railway station =

Former railway station in England

Longton Bridge

General information
- Location: South Ribble; England
- Coordinates: 53.7214°N 2.7903°W
- Grid reference: SD479252
- Platforms: 2

Other information
- Status: Disused

History
- Original company: West Lancashire Railway
- Pre-grouping: Lancashire and Yorkshire Railway
- Post-grouping: London, Midland and Scottish Railway

Key dates
- 18 May 1882: Opened as Longton
- 1 January 1892: Renamed to Longton Bridge
- 6 April 1964: Closed to goods
- 7 September 1964: Closed to passengers
Location

Longton Bridge was a railway station on the West Lancashire Railway in England. It served the village of Longton.

== History ==
The station opened as Longton on 18 May 1882 as the temporary terminus of the West Lancashire Railway when it opened the section of line from River Douglas.

The station became a through station when the section of line to Preston Fishergate Hill opened on 16 September 1882. It was renamed to Longton Bridge on 1 January 1892.

The station was located on an embankment at the southern edge of Longton to the east of the road running south (now Liverpool Road). The line was double track and platforms were provided on both sides. The main station building, "built in the company's typical red brick style" was to the north of the running lines, there was a signal box at the end of the Preston bound platform. There was a small goods yard to the north and east of the station able to accommodate most types of goods including live stock, it was equipped with single line shed and a one-ton crane.

== Early services ==
Upon opening a service of nine trains in each direction was advertised for each weekday, an additional train on Saturdays for the market and four trains each way on Sundays.

== Takeover ==
The railway company had financial difficulties which led to it being absorbed by the Lancashire and Yorkshire Railway (L&YR) on 1 July 1897. The L&YR amalgamated with the London and North Western Railway (L&NWR) on 1 January 1922 just one year before being grouped into the London, Midland and Scottish Railway (LMS) on 1 January 1923.

== Later services ==
In 1922 the L&NWR service had increased to 18 trains stopping here from Southport Chapel Street mainly going to Preston, otherwise one went to Todmorden and one to Accrington. There were an extra three trains on Saturdays and the Accrington train carried on to Colne. The services in the other direction were similar, there were five services each way on Sundays.

By 1939 the LMS service was 22 trains each way on weekdays (all to or from Preston, except one to Todmorden, one to Accrington (except on Saturdays) and one to East Lancashire) with three additional services on Saturdays, there were 9 trains each way on Sundays.

By January 1962, the London Midland Region of British Railways were operating 11 trains each way, with three to six additional services on Saturdays. There were no trains on Sundays.

== Closure ==
The station closed to goods traffic on 6 April 1964 and to passengers on 7 September 1964 when the line closed.

Preceding station	Disused railways	Following station
Hoole; Line and station closed	Lancashire and Yorkshire Railway; West Lancashire Railway	New Longton and Hutton; Line and station closed
