= Tarleton Branch =

The Tarleton branch was a 1 mile 7 1/4 chains (1.76 km) long single track branch railway line in Lancashire, England, that ran from Hesketh Bank on the West Lancashire Railway (WLR) to Tarleton Lock. It was built to convey goods traffic arriving along the Leeds and Liverpool Canal for transfer onto the railway that was experiencing delays on the River Douglas due to tidal problems.

== Description ==
The Tarleton branch was a 1 mile 7 1/4 chains (1.76 km) long single track branch railway line in Lancashire, England, that ran from Hesketh Bank on the West Lancashire Railway (WLR) to Tarleton Lock, where the Rufford Branch of the Leeds and Liverpool Canal connected to the River Douglas. (Note: Railways in the United Kingdom are, for historical reasons, measured in miles and chains. A chain is 22 yards (20 m) long, there are 80 chains to the mile.) (Note: The River Douglas is also known as the River Asland.)

The line ran roughly parallel to the River Douglas from a junction to the east of Hesketh Bank station to Tarleton Lock where there was already an interchange wharf between canal barges and sea-going craft and now the railway leased a goods shed alongside the interchange at 53.6850°N 2.8239°W.

The line was constructed by the contractors Braddock and Mathews with work starting in late 1879 with a completion date set for 29 February 1880, it is not known when the branch opened but it was operating by 31 July 1880 with transfers being made at Tarleton lock between the canal and branch. Marshall (1969) comments that "the freight rates must have been extraordinarily low to make this route competitive against the L&YR" who had a more direct route and no need to transfer loads between canal and railway.

== Ownership ==
The branch was privately built by the WLR, in the sense that it did not have an Act of Parliament. (Note: The Regulation of Railways Act 1868 (31 & 32 Vict. c. 119) enabled railways to be built without an Act provided that the landowners involved had shown their willingness to selling their land.)

The branch was built on land belonging to Sir Thomas George Fermor-Hesketh, Lord Lilford and the Leeds and Liverpool Canal company. The WLR paid rent to all three owners. In 1881 the WLR obtained the West Lancashire Railway Act 1881 (44 & 45 Vict. c. lvii). which enabled them to compulsory purchase the land but the money to do so was not readily available. The railway eventually reached an arrangement with Lord Lilford sometime after 1885, Sir Thomas George Fermor-Hesketh eventually conveyed his land to the company without charge in 1895. The land at the terminus at Tarleton owned by the Leeds and Liverpool Canal company leased it to the railway on a peppercorn rent of 20 shillings per year (approximately £110 per year in 2026) for 21 years.

After the Lancashire and Yorkshire Railway (L&YR) absorbed the WLR in 1897 they realised they did not own the land upon which the terminus was situated and entered into negotiations with the canal company firstly to lease the land, which was offered on an annual tenancy of £10 per year (approximately £1200 per year in 2026), and ultimately to purchase the land outright which was agreed to in 1900.

== Passenger service ==
The branch had a short-lived passenger service when the L&YR opened two halts and introduced a railmotor service that started from Crossens on 3 June 1912. The service comprised seven trains per day, except on Sundays when there was no service.

The halts were described by the inspecting officer before opening as being at rail level, having two oil lamps and a nameboard, the service was authorised provided trains did not exceed 15 miles per hour (24 km/h) and only ran during daylight hours:

- Boat Yard Crossing at 53.6882°N 2.8282°W, the halt has been demolished and the site is now a housing estate.
- Tarleton at 53.6861°N 2.8251°W, the halt has been demolished and the site is adjacent to the current Tarleton Boatyard between Tarleton Academy and the canal.

== Closure ==
The railmotor service ceased on 1 October 1913 and the halts were closed.

Goods service declined after the passenger service was withdrawn, by 1925 the branch appeared unused, it was formally closed in November 1930. A significant portion of the line's trackbed now forms the Henry Alty Way which opened in 2021.

== Bibliography ==
- Brown, Joe (2021). Liverpool & Manchester Railway Atlas. Manchester: Crécy Publishing. ISBN 9780860936879. OCLC 1112373294.
- Clinker, C. R. (October 1978). Clinker's Register of Closed Passenger Stations and Goods Depots in England, Scotland and Wales 1830–1977. Bristol: Avon-Anglia Publications & Services. ISBN 0-905466-19-5. OCLC 5726624.
- Dixon, John; Gilmour, John (March 2002). "West Lancashire Railway Mysteries Unravelled" (PDF). Railway and Canal Historical Society Journal. 34 Part 1 (181): 4–16. Archived from the original (PDF) on 20 January 2025.
- Grant, Donald J. (2017). Directory of the Railway Companies of Great Britain (1st ed.). Kibworth Beauchamp, Leicestershire: Troubador Publishing Ltd. ISBN 978-1-78803-768-6.
- Hadfield, Charles; Biddle, Gordon (1970). The Canals of North West England. The Canals of the British Isles. Vol. 1. Newton Abbot: David & Charles. ISBN 0 7153 4956 2.
- Holt, Geoffrey O.; Biddle, Gordon (1986). The North West. A Regional history of the railways of Great Britain. Vol. 10 (2nd ed.). David St. John Thomas. ISBN 978-0-946537-34-1. OCLC 643506870.
- Jacobs, Gerald (2009). "Railway Mileages". In Bridge, Mike (ed.). TRACKatlas of Mainland Britain. Bradford on Avon: Trackmaps. ISBN 978-0-9549866-5-0.
- Marshall, John (1969). The Lancashire & Yorkshire Railway. Vol. 1. Newton Abbot: David & Charles. ISBN 978-0-7153-4352-4.
- Quick, Michael (2023) [2001]. Railway passenger stations in Great Britain: a chronology (PDF). version 5.05. Railway & Canal Historical Society.
