= Hesketh Bank railway station =

Former railway station in England

Hesketh Bank

General information
- Location: West Lancashire; England
- Coordinates: 53.6987°N 2.8394°W
- Grid reference: SD44702282
- Platforms: 2

Other information
- Status: Disused

History
- Original company: West Lancashire Railway
- Pre-grouping: Lancashire and Yorkshire Railway
- Post-grouping: London, Midland and Scottish Railway

Key dates
- 20 February 1878: Opened as Hesketh Bank and Tarleton
- 1882: Renamed to Hesketh Bank for Tarleton
- 1911–1912: Renamed Hesketh Bank
- 30 April 1964: Closed to goods
- 7 September 1964: Closed to passengers
Location

Hesketh Bank railway station was a railway station on the West Lancashire Railway (WLR) in North West England, which served the village of Hesketh Bank.

== History ==
The station opened as Hesketh Bank and Tarleton on 20 February 1878 when the WLR opened the first section of its line. The first section ran from Hesketh Park to here, the station becoming the initial northern terminus.

The station became a through station when the section of line to Longton opened on 18 May 1882. Sometime in 1882 the station was renamed to Hesketh Bank for Tarleton. The suffix was dropped c. 1911–1912 and the station was just known as Hesketh Bank. (Note: Bradshaw (1895) has the station name without suffix.)

The station was located about 3/4 mile (1.2 km) to the south of Hesketh Bank village where Hesketh Lane (later became Station Road) crossed the railway on an overbridge. Tarleton was approximately 1 1/2 miles (2.4 km) to the south of the station.

The line was double track and platforms were provided on both sides, they were accessed using stairways down from the road overbridge or using the stations drive off Hesketh Lane. The main station building was on the northern platform.

There was a small goods yard to the north of the station able to accommodate most types of goods including live stock, it was equipped with single line goods shed. To the south of the running lines there was an additional siding which ran through a turntable into a single-road engine shed that had opened in June 1878.

On the Preston side of Hesketh Lane were several more sidings and a headshunt leading into Hesketh Bank brickworks (leased by Henry Alty and known as Alty's brickworks), a major local employer and freight destination.

The station became a junction when a branch line to Tarleton Lock, where the Leeds and Liverpool Canal met the River Douglas was constructed in 1880. It connected to the WLR 170 yards (160 m) to the west of the station.

== Early services ==
In 1878 the company ran twelve trains a day along the length of the line with an extra service late on Saturdays, there were four trains each way on Sundays. Some of these services were quickly withdrawn due to a lack of passengers.

== Later services ==
In 1922 the L&NWR service had increased to 18 trains stopping here from Southport Chapel Street mainly going to Preston, otherwise one went to Todmorden and one to Accrington. There were an extra three trains on Saturdays and the Accrington train carried on to Colne. The services in the other direction were similar, there were five services each way on Sundays.

By 1939 the LMS service was 22 trains each way on weekdays (all to or from Preston, except one to Todmorden, one to Accrington (except on Saturdays) and one to East Lancashire) with three additional services on Saturdays, there were 9 trains each way on Sundays. (Note: The timetable doesn't specify a destination, just To East Lancashire.)

== Closure ==
The station closed to goods traffic on 30 April 1964 (except for a private siding) and to passengers on 7 September 1964 when the line closed. The land was later developed as a housing estate.

Preceding station	Disused railways	Following station
Hundred End; Line and station closed	Lancashire and Yorkshire Railway; West Lancashire Railway	River Douglas; Line and station closed
Hundred End; Line and station closed	Lancashire and Yorkshire Railway; West Lancashire Railway; Tarleton Branch	Boat Yard Crossing Halt; Line and station closed

== Bibliography ==
- Bradshaw, George (2011) [December 1895]. Bradshaw's Rail Times for Great Britain and Ireland December 1895: A Reprint of the Classic Timetable Complete with Period Advertisements and Shipping Connections to All Parts. Midhurst: Middleton Press. ISBN 978-1-908174-11-6. OCLC 832579861.
- Bradshaw, George (1985) [July 1922]. Bradshaw's General Railway and Steam Navigation guide for Great Britain and Ireland: A reprint of the July 1922 issue. Newton Abbot: David & Charles. ISBN 978-0-7153-8708-5. OCLC 12500436.
- Clinker, C. R. (October 1978). Clinker's Register of Closed Passenger Stations and Goods Depots in England, Scotland and Wales 1830–1977. Bristol: Avon-Anglia Publications & Services. ISBN 0-905466-19-5. OCLC 5726624.
- Cotterall, J.E. (1982). The West Lancashire Railway. Oakwood.
- Dixon, John; Gilmour, John (March 2002). "West Lancashire Railway Mysteries Unravelled" (PDF). Railway and Canal Historical Society Journal. 34 Part 1 (181): 4–16. Archived from the original (PDF) on 20 January 2025.
- Hindle, David John (2022). Lament for a Branch Line: The Preston to Southport Railway (2nd Enlarged ed.). Silver Link Books. ISBN 978 1 85794 609 3.
- Hurst, Geoffrey (1992). Register of Closed Railways: 1948-1991. Worksop, Nottinghamshire: Milepost Publications. ISBN 0-9477-9618-5.
- LMS Railway (1939). London Midland & Scottish Passenger Railway Timetable- July 3rd to September 24th, inclusive, 1939. London: LMS.
- Quick, Michael (2023) [2001]. Railway passenger stations in Great Britain: a chronology (PDF). version 5.05. Railway & Canal Historical Society.
- The Railway Clearing House (1970) [1904]. The Railway Clearing House Handbook of Railway Stations 1904 (1970 D&C Reprint ed.). Newton Abbot: David & Charles Reprints. ISBN 0-7153-5120-6.
