= Hundred End =

Hamlet in Lancashire, England

Coordinates: 53.694°N 2.883°W

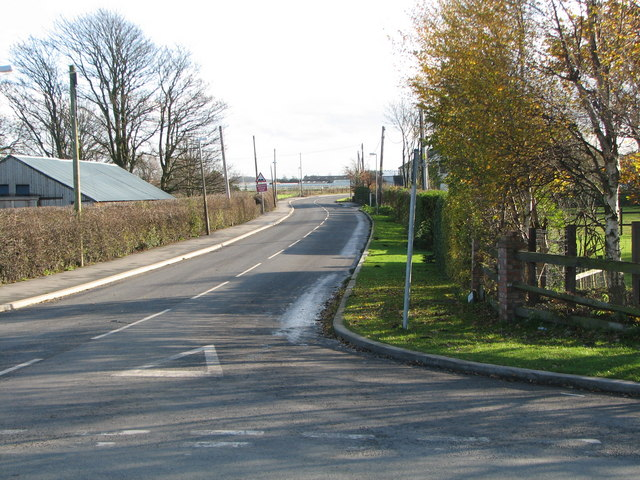
- Hundred End Lane

- Location in West Lancashire Location within Lancashire
- OS grid reference: SD417223
- Civil parish: North Meols
- District: West Lancashire
- Shire county: Lancashire
- Region: North West
- Country: England
- Sovereign state: United Kingdom
- Post town: PRESTON
- Postcode district: PR4
- Dialling code: 01772
- Police: Lancashire
- Fire: Lancashire
- Ambulance: North West
- UK Parliament: South Ribble

Hundred End is a coastal hamlet in West Lancashire, England. It is 2 miles east of the larger village of Banks and 2 miles west of the larger village of Hesketh Bank.

It is administered by the West Lancashire District Council and North Meols parish council. It falls in the South Ribble parliamentary constituency.

== History ==
Hundred End railway station was previously a stop on the West Lancashire Railway, fully opened in 1878, which ran between Southport and Preston, carrying both passengers and cargo from the fields of the area to be sold at town markets.

Low passenger numbers later led to the railway's decline and its closure was assured by the Beeching Axe in 1964. The station house has since been demolished but the train track can be followed along a footpath that stretches towards Banks.

== Toponymy ==
The hamlet is called Hundred End because it was situated on the boundary between the two hundreds of West Derby and Leyland.

== Geography ==
The area has similar geography to that of Banks.

There is an enclosed salt marsh that is used for grazing cattle and the marshes are managed by the RSPB.

== Religion ==
Hesketh Moss Methodist Church is a small chapel which was built by the local farmers of the hamlet, the nearest Church of England Church are in Hesketh Bank and Banks.

== Education ==
The hamlet does not have a school, but children usually attend primary schools in Tarleton, Mere Brow, Banks and Hesketh Bank. The nearest Secondary School being Tarleton High School.

== Landmarks ==
Hundred End Farm, built in 1837 is the oldest building in the hamlet. The largest house is Ribble Hall which is a modern mansion built by Godfrey Crook. He was responsible for taking away the train tracks and the gravel beds when the West Lancashire Railway line closed, he built Ribble Hall on land near the former Hundred End railway station.
