= Charles Driver =

British architect

Charles Driver FRIBA
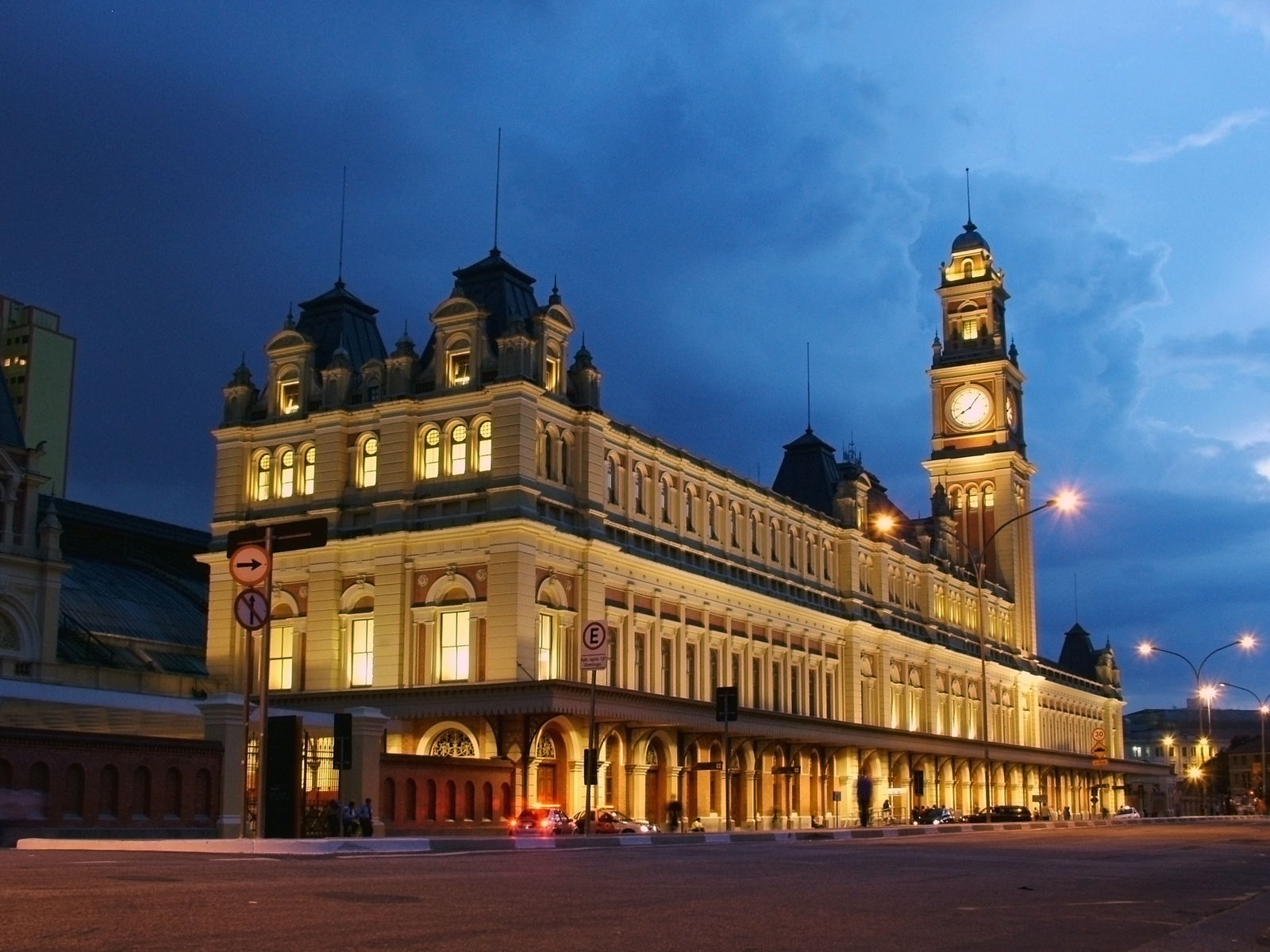
- Luz Station, São Paulo, Brazil
- Born: 23 March 1832
- Died: 27 October 1900 (aged 68)
- Occupation: Architect
- Buildings: London, Brighton and South Coast Railway stations, Thames Embankment and pumping stations

Charles Henry Driver FRIBA (23 March 1832 – 27 October 1900) was a significant British architect of the Victorian era, with a reputation for pioneering use of ornamental iron work for which he was seen as a leading authority.

== Biography ==
Driver began his career as a draughtsman in the office of Frank Forster, Engineer to the Commissioners of Sewers, in London. In 1852, he was employed by Liddell and Gordon as a draughtsman, and he completed designs for bridges and stations for the Midland Railway on their Leicester and Hitchin Railway. His original case of drawing tools with a monogrammed lid 'ChD 1855' has been passed down through the family.

Starting in 1857, he worked under Robert Jacomb-Hood in the Engineer's Office of the London, Brighton and South Coast Railway including work on designs for their London Bridge terminus. In 1866, he created designs for the Three Bridges to Tunbridge Wells Central Line stations. In 1867, he designed for Box Hill & Westhumble railway station on the new Leatherhead to Dorking line. In 1862, he designed the Slade drinking fountain in Kennington Park for Felix Slade. In 1863, he submitted designs for Saint Fin Barre's Cathedral in Cork and although his design was admired, he lost out to William Burges.

After 1864, he assisted civil engineer Sir Joseph Bazalgette with designs for the landing stages and masonry of the Thames Embankment including work on the dolphin lamp standard, and for the pumping stations at Abbey Mills and Crossness. These innovative facilities reduced diseases, such as deadly cholera epidemics, by moving raw sewage and polluted effluent downstream of London for discharge into the Thames.

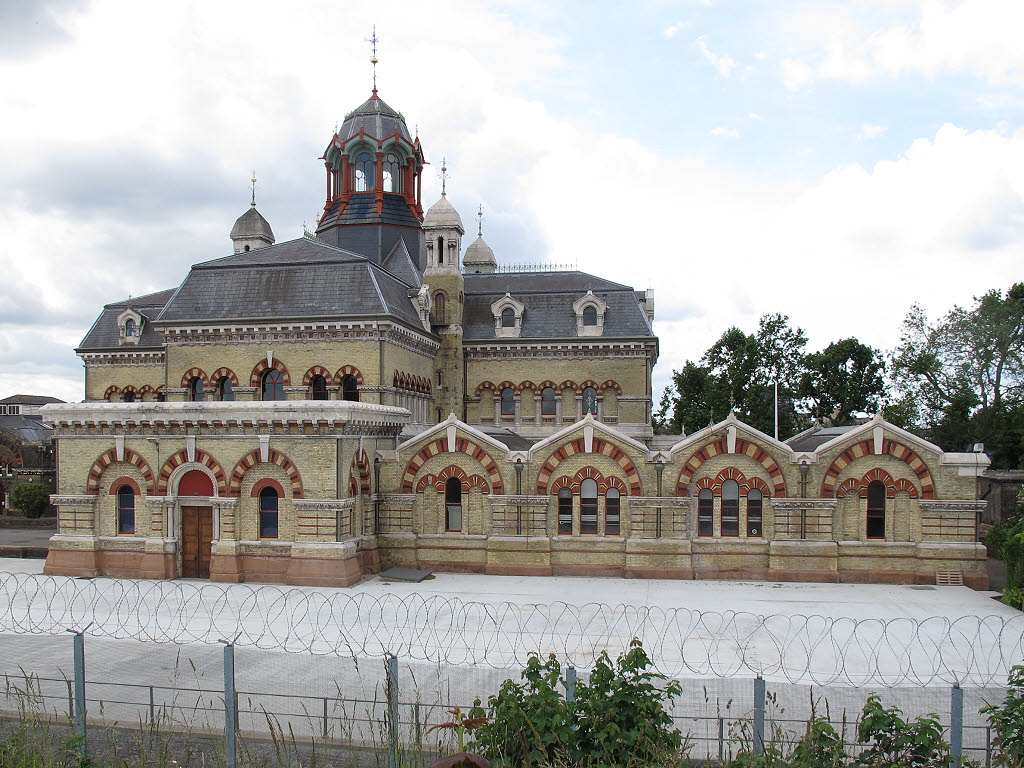
Abbey Mills pumping station

In 1869, he began work for the Crystal Palace company designing and building the Aquarium, Orangery, and repairing the Water Towers. He also pioneered the use of ornamental tile work in industrial interiors. Based on the success of the Crystal Palace Aquarium, Driver won a contract in 1872 with the Council of the Vienna Exhibition to design a permanent aquarium in Vienna.

In 1872, Driver completed the Horton Infirmary at Banbury in Oxfordshire. Beginning in 1873, he worked with Sir James Brunlees and Alexander McKerrow on designs for King's Lynn Bridge, Clifton and other stations. He was also the architect for the piers at Llandudno, Nice, and Southend-on-Sea. He designed Preston Fishergate Hill railway station and Southport Central railway station on the West Lancashire Railway, they opened in 1882.

From 1888, he worked with Edward Woods in preparing designs for Mercado Central de Santiago, and for stations on the Buenos Aires and Ensenada Port Railway. From 1894 to 1895, he was on the design teams for stations on the Tottenham and Forest Gate Railway.

He designed the West Pier Pavilion at Brighton, and was the architect for the stations (including the "Station of Light" in São Paulo, Brazil) on the São Paulo Railway. He was also responsible for Dorking Town Hall, Dorking Waterworks, Dorking Union, and many shops and residences in Dorking; Banbury Hospital; the late Sir Tatton Sykes and Ellesmere Memorials; and the Mark Masons’ Hall in Great Queen Street. He also enjoyed painting oils and water colours, some of which survive today. He was appointed a Fellow of the Royal Institute of British Architects (FRIBA).

He died on 27 October 1900 and is buried in West Norwood Cemetery. He left an estate of £1,601 6s. 6d, probate being granted to his widow, Caroline Driver, on 16 November 1900.
