= Crossens =

District of Southport, Merseyside, England

Coordinates: 53.6697°N 2.9487°W

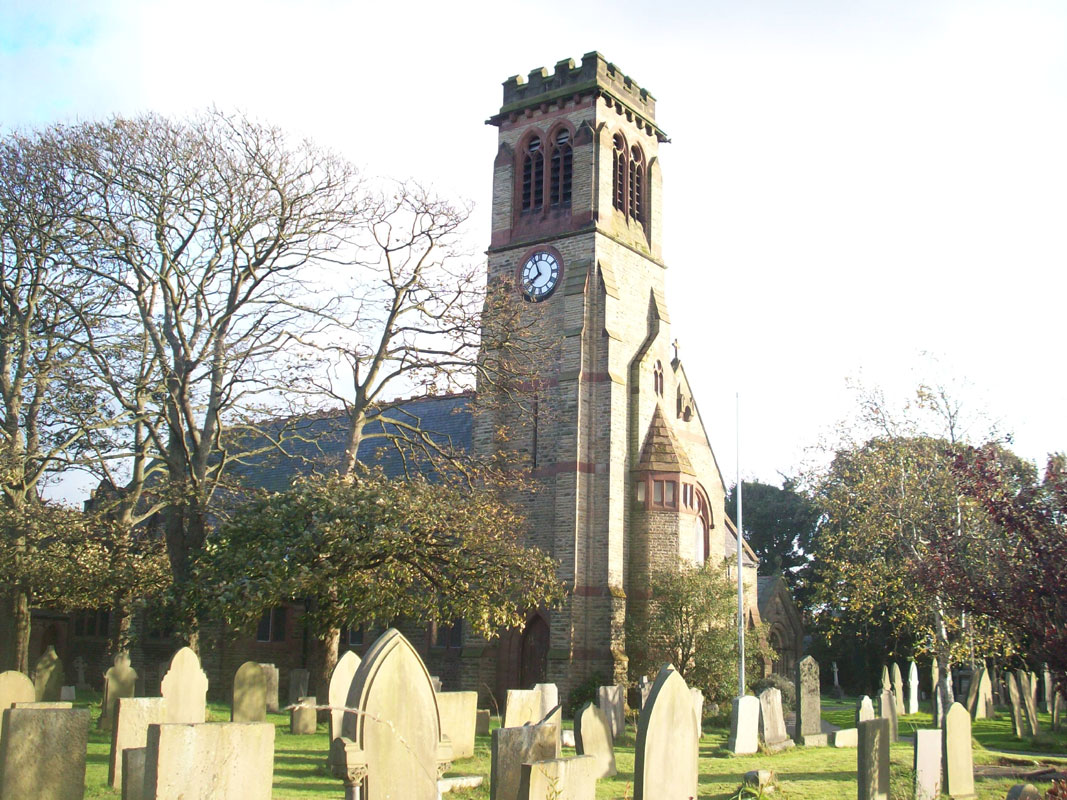
- St John's Church

- Location in Southport Location within Merseyside
- OS grid reference: SD369198
- Metropolitan borough: Sefton
- Metropolitan county: Merseyside
- Region: North West
- Country: England
- Sovereign state: United Kingdom
- Post town: SOUTHPORT
- Postcode district: PR9
- Dialling code: 01704
- Police: Merseyside
- Fire: Merseyside
- Ambulance: North West
- UK Parliament: Southport

Crossens is the northernmost district of the town of Southport, Merseyside, England.

Historically part of the ancient parish of North Meols and entirely in Lancashire, most of Crossens was transferred to Merseyside on 1 April 1974, when local government boundaries were reorganised nationally. Part of northern Crossens, known as Fiddlers Ferry, is in West Lancashire. Formerly, the village was a detached settlement lying on the western edge of Martin Mere, but after the drainage of the Mere and the expansion of Southport, it had become absorbed into the town's conurbation.

== History ==
Formerly Crossenes or Crosnes, meaning a “ness” or headland with a cross. The cross was possibly a guide for shipping or people crossing the Ribble Estuary from Freckleton (near Lytham). A hospice or lodging house was sited in Crossens where travellers could rest after making the crossing. It is also believed to be the point at which 2,000 horsemen from a retreating Royalist force crossed the Ribble estuary following the Battle of Marston Moor. They later joined the Siege of Lathom House.

Sited as it was on the shore of Martin Mere and at the seaward end of Crossens Sluice, Crossens formed the basis of a substantial fishing industry supporting the surrounding area and the nearby village of Banks. After Martin Mere was largely reclaimed for farmland, the focus of the town increasingly turned to agriculture, and to this day the high-quality soil supports several flower and vegetable farms in the east of the district. Farming of some scale or other has been a feature of this area since medieval times. However, the Industrial Revolution led to Crossens' incorporation into Southport as a site for housing for the larger town's burgeoning worker population.

== Economy ==
The first half of the 20th century saw the area becoming home to some light industry (including the Vulcan motor works), but apart from some small industrial units the area is now primarily a commuter suburb for Southport, Preston and Ormskirk.

=== Television manufacture ===
In March 1955, Mullard bought part of the Brockhouse Engineering site on Balmoral Drive, the former Corgi Motorcycle Co Ltd. and Vulcan (motor vehicles), and built a factory at Blowick.

It supported a factory at Whitebirk, with two other factories at Fleetwood, and one in Rawtenstall. Mullard Magnetic Components made important parts for television tubes in the 1970s. The television tubes were made by Mullard, part of Philips NV of the Netherlands, in Simonstone, Lancashire near Burnley, and a newer plant at Belmont, County Durham, that opened in 1972.

It became Philips Components Ltd in 1988, LG Phillips Displays in 2001, and closed in 2003.

== Criffel granite boulder ==
The Criffel Stone is a large boulder that lies at the side of Banks Road, Crossens. It is made of Criffel granite; a type of rock that is only normally found in Dumfries, Scotland. It was found in the ground when the pumping station on Banks Road was being built in 1959.

Geologists found that the rock was deposited in the area during the last ice age (18,000 years ago) through the movement of glaciers. Rocks like this that have been transported in this way are called erratics.

== Transport ==
Crossens lay on the route of the West Lancashire Railway from Southport to Preston; Crossens railway station, opened in 1878, was the last station within the Southport boundary. In April 1904 it became the final electrified station on the Lancashire and Yorkshire Railway's suburban lines radiating from Liverpool. The electric trains shared the line from Southport with steam trains continuing to Preston. The line and station closed on 7 September 1964.

Being the northernmost part of Southport, Crossens is the terminus of several bus routes - Arriva North West services 44, 47 and 49 terminate at the Plough Hotel roundabout, still known as such even though the Plough Hotel was demolished c.2015. Other bus services passing through Crossens include Stagecoach Merseyside and South Lancashire services 2, X2 and 347. In addition, there is also the Cumfybus service 40, which terminates on Harrogate Way.

== Gallery ==
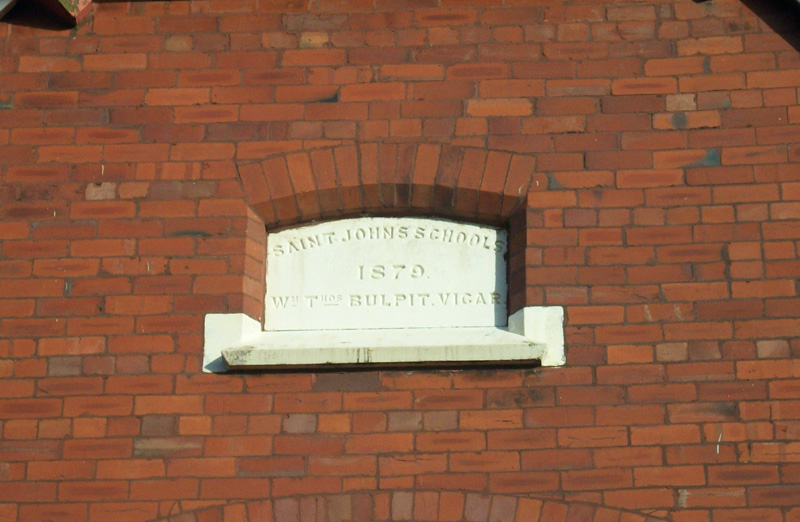

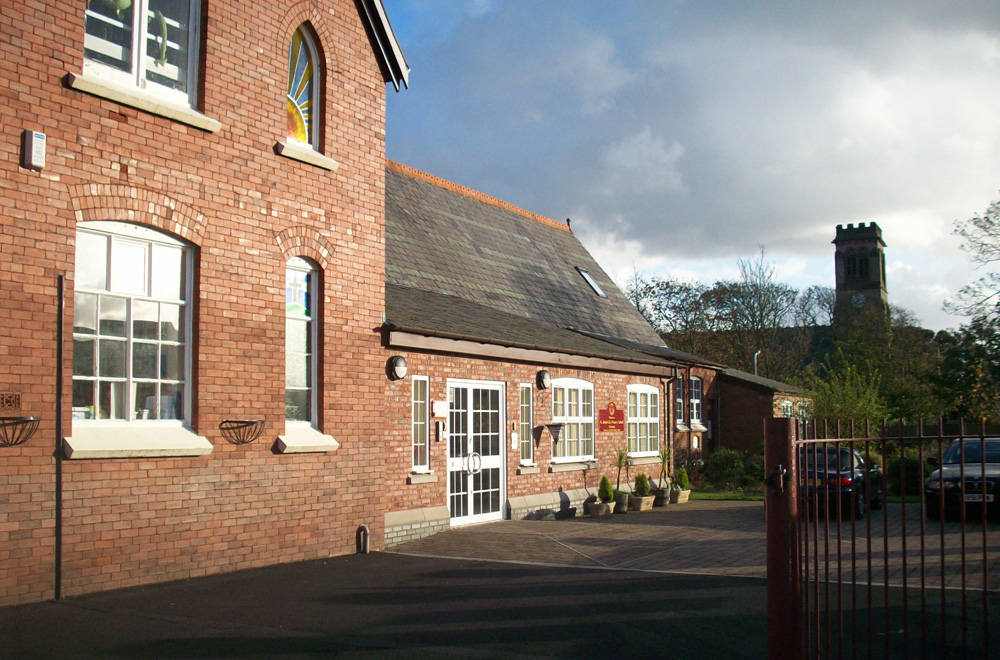

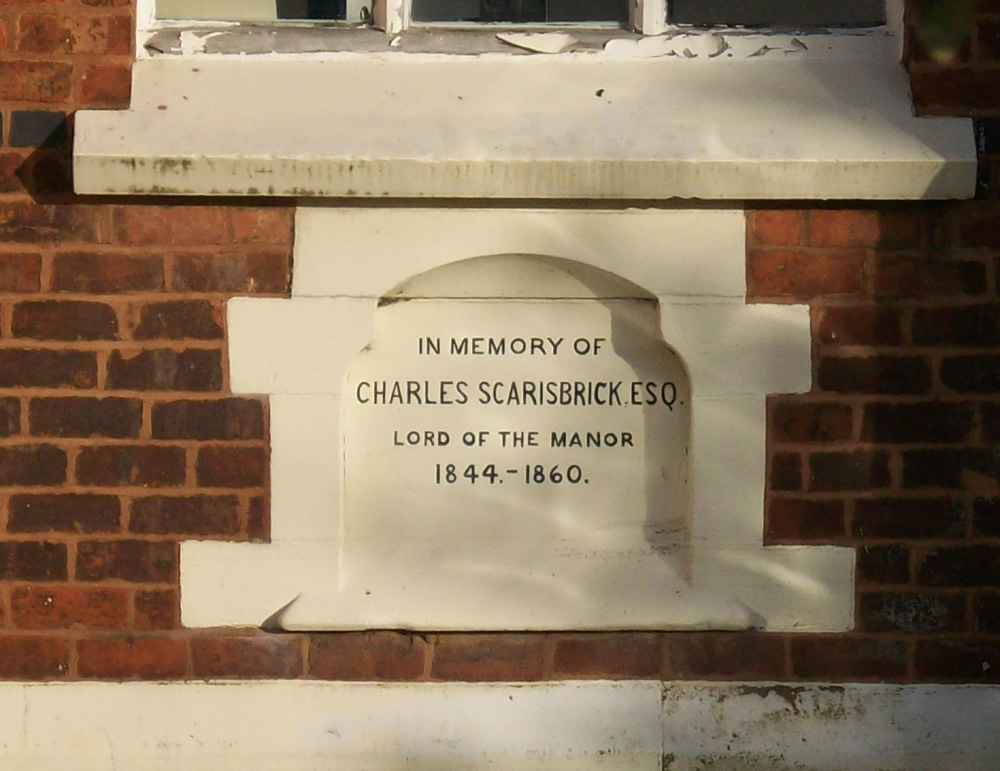

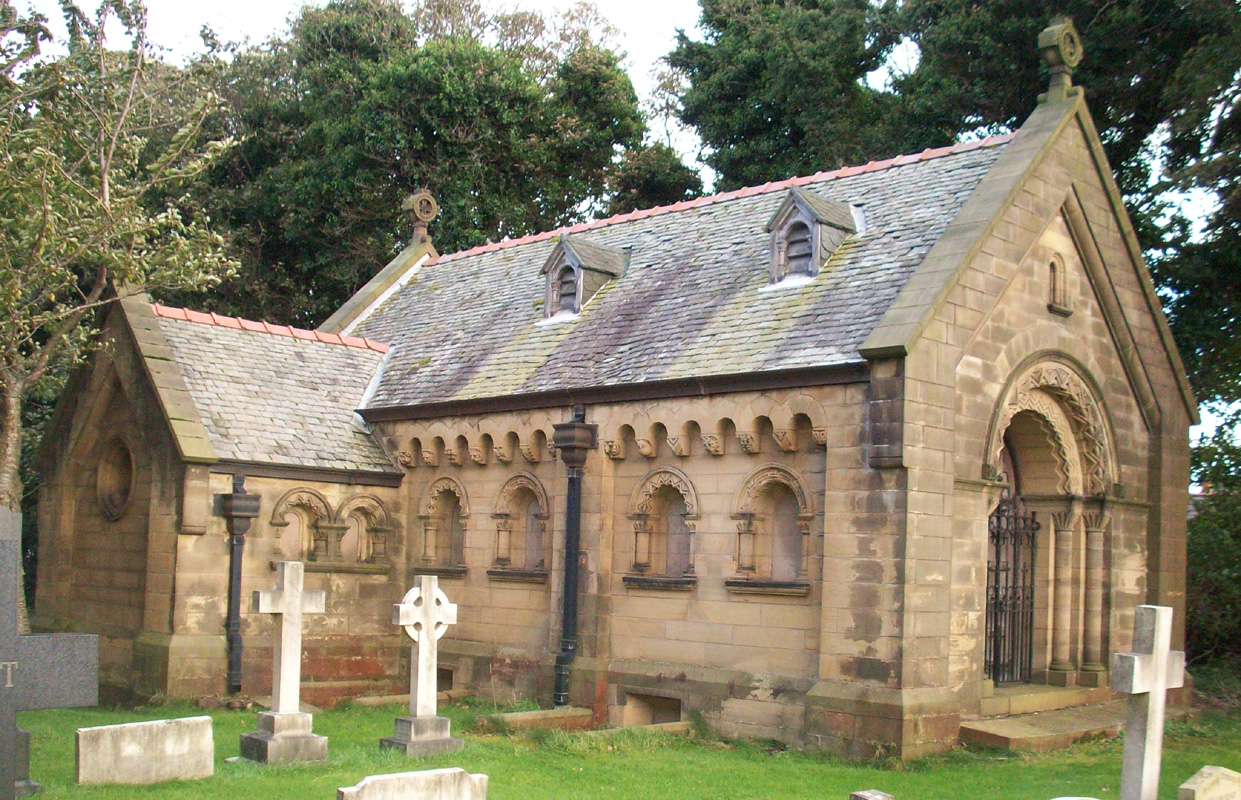
