= Southport Ash Street railway station =

Disused railway station in Southport, Merseyside

Southport Ash Street

General information
- Location: Southport, Sefton; England
- Coordinates: 53.6436°N 2.9898°W
- Grid reference: SD346168
- Platforms: 2

Other information
- Status: Disused

History
- Original company: West Lancashire Railway

Key dates
- 10 June 1878: Opened as Southport Windsor Road
- By November 1878: Relocated
- 4 September 1882: Renamed Southport Ash Street
- By January 1902: Relocated
- 1 March 1902: Renamed Southport St Lukes
Location

Southport Ash Street was a railway station in Southport, Lancashire, England.

== First Windsor Road ==
The station opened as Southport Windsor Road on 10 June 1878 as the temporary terminus of the West Lancashire Railway (WLR) when it extended its line into Southport from Hesketh Park. The station, described as a temporary platform, was probably situated on the west side of Windsor Road footbridge, although the footbridge had not been constructed at this time.

== Second Windsor Road/First Ash Street ==
In order to complete the WLR line into its permanent terminal, Southport Central, the temporary Windsor Road station was moved. A new station was constructed on the east side of Windsor Road footbridge between the footbridge and Ash Street/St Luke's Road. (Note: Ash Street and St Luke's Road are the same road, one runs into the other and they join somewhere in the vicinity of the rail overbridges, Ash Street is to the south, St Luke's Road to the north.) This new station replaced the original platform at some time before November 1878, the Windsor Street footbridge opened on 3 December 1878.

The station had two platforms on the outside of three running lines. The booking office was on the road over-bridge with steps leading down to the 'up' , that is Southport direction platform, there was a footbridge over the running lines to the 'down' platform. Each platform had a waiting room. (Note: Down trains usually headed away from the major conurbation, usually London, some railway companies ran 'up' to their headquarters location, in this case 'up' was towards Southport.)

This new station was renamed Southport Ash Street on 4 September 1882, the same day that the permanent terminus was opened at Southport Central.

From 1 November 1887 the Liverpool, Southport and Preston Junction Railway (LS&PJR) from Altcar and Hillhouse on the Southport and Cheshire Lines Extension Railway (SCLER) to Southport Central opened and its trains began to use the station.

== Second Ash Street/St Lukes ==
In 1897 the Lancashire & Yorkshire Railway (L&YR) absorbed the WLR and the LS&PJR, the L&YR found itself with two stations situated very close together, one either side of the road over-bridge, St Lukes to the south with its platform on the eastern side of the road, and the former WLR's Southport Ash Street station to the north with its platforms to the west of the road.

The L&YR rebuilt the stations, moving Ash Street services to the eastern side of the road and providing a new booking office. The new platforms on the former WLR and LS&PJR lines opened in January 1902, although they were still being called Southport Ash Street. (Note: There is some confusion over the dates of work completing, name changes and operations starting between the closing of Ash Street and the alterations of St Luke's and somewhere in between the provision of temporary facilities.)

On 1 March 1902, the station was renamed as Southport St Luke's, and Ash Street station ceased to exist.

| Preceding station | Disused railways | Following station |
|---|---|---|
| Terminus until 1882 | West Lancashire Railway | Hesketh Park |
| Southport Central from 1882 | West Lancashire Railway | Hesketh Park |
| Southport Central | Liverpool, Southport and Preston Junction Railway | Meols Cop |

== Bibliography ==
- Brown, Joe (2021). Liverpool & Manchester Railway Atlas. Manchester: Crécy Publishing. ISBN 9780860936879. OCLC 1112373294.
- Dixon, John; Gilmour, John (March 2002). "West Lancashire Railway Mysteries Unravelled" (PDF). Railway and Canal Historical Society Journal. 34 Part 1 (181): 4–16. Archived from the original (PDF) on 20 January 2025.
- Grant, Donald J. (2017). Directory of the Railway Companies of Great Britain (1st ed.). Kibworth Beauchamp, Leicestershire: Troubador Publishing Ltd. ISBN 978-1-78803-768-6.
- Hindle, David John (2022). Lament for a Branch Line: The Preston to Southport Railway (2nd Enlarged ed.). Silver Link Books. ISBN 978 1 85794 609 3.
- Quick, Michael (2023) [2001]. Railway passenger stations in Great Britain: a chronology (PDF). version 5.05. Railway & Canal Historical Society.
- Simmons, Jack (1997). "'up' and 'down'". In Simmons, Jack; Biddle, Gordon (eds.). The Oxford Companion to British Railway History From 1603 to the 1990s (1st ed.). Oxford: Oxford University Press. p. 548. ISBN 0-19-211697-5.
