= Southport railway station =

Railway station in Merseyside, England

Southport
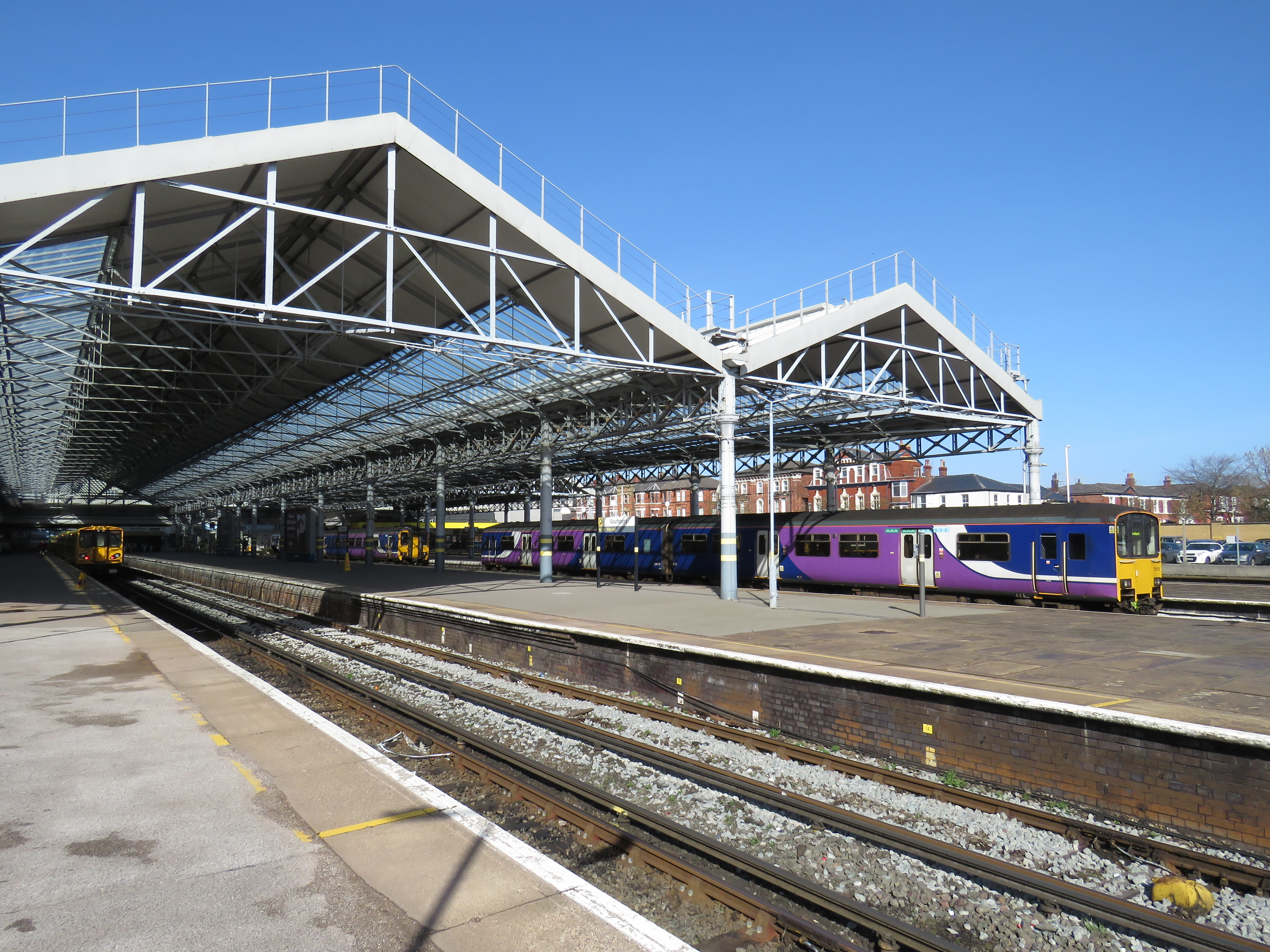
- Southport railway station, March 2019

General information
- Location: Southport, Sefton, England
- Coordinates: 53.647°N 3.002°W
- Grid reference: SD338171
- Manager: Merseyrail
- Transit authority: Merseytravel
- Platforms: 6

Other information
- Station code: SOP
- Fare zone: D1
- Classification: DfT category D

History
- Original company: Liverpool, Crosby and Southport Railway
- Pre-grouping: Lancashire and Yorkshire Railway
- Post-grouping: London Midland and Scottish Railway

Key dates
- 5 August 1851: Opened as Southport Chapel Street
- 5 May 1969: Renamed Southport

Passengers
- 2020/21: ▼1.267 million
- Interchange: ▼4,401
- 2021/22: ▲3.094 million
- Interchange: ▲13,212
- 2022/23: ▲3.340 million
- Interchange: ▲16,208
- 2023/24: ▲3.481 million
- Interchange: ▼10,810
- 2024/25: ▲3.789 million
- Interchange: ▲14,712
Location
Notes
- Passenger statistics from the Office of Rail and Road

Southport railway station serves the town of Southport, in Merseyside, England. It is the northern terminus of the Southport branch of the Northern Line of the Merseyrail network and the Manchester-Southport Line. It is the fourth-busiest station on the Merseyrail network. The station and services to Liverpool Central are operated by Merseyrail, with services to Stalybridge operated by Northern Trains.

== History ==
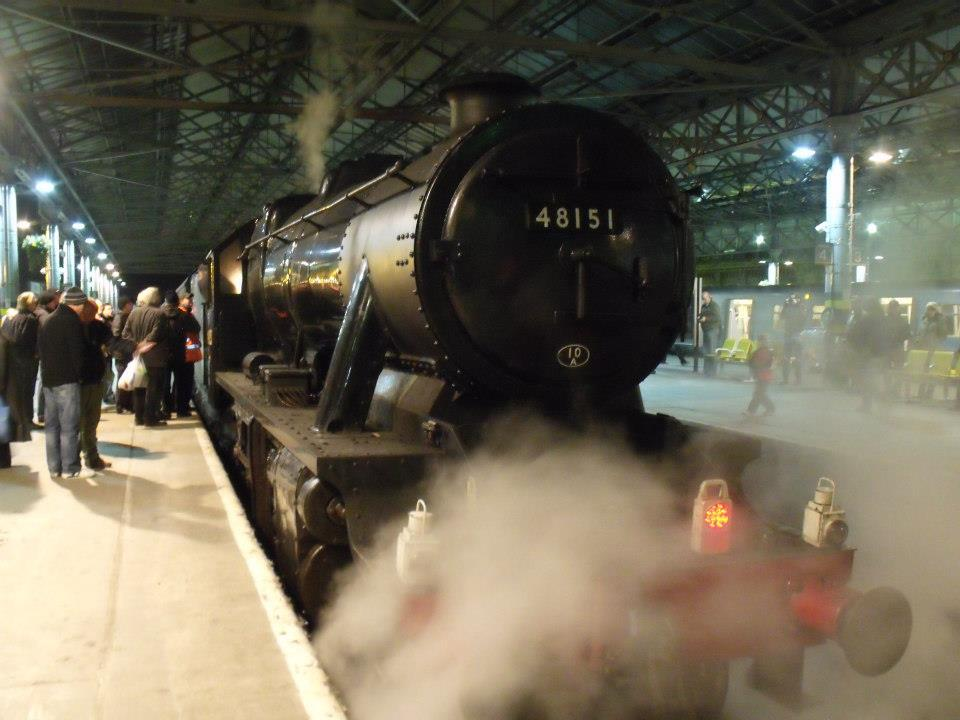
LMS 8F 2-8-0 no. 48151 at Southport Chapel Street station, after working "The Roses Express", 4 April 2012

The Liverpool, Crosby and Southport Railway (LC&SR) opened a line on 24 July 1848 from Liverpool to a temporary station at Eastbank Street, about 0.5 miles (0.8 km) short of the current terminus.

The LC&SR line was extended on 5 August 1851 to the current station which opened as Southport Chapel Street. The LC&SR refused to allow the Manchester and Southport Railway (M&SR) to use its station and therefore the East Lancashire Railway (ELR) (one of the co-owners of the M&SR) built Southport London Street station next door.

London Street station was closed on 1 April 1857 and passenger services were transferred to Chapel Street.

From 1882, the West Lancashire Railway opened a line from Southport Derby Road (later known as Southport Central and situated close to Chapel Street station) to Preston Fishergate Hill.

In 1884, the Cheshire Lines Committee's (CLC) North Liverpool Extension Line from Liverpool Central to Southport Lord Street was opened. The West Lancashire Railway sponsored the Liverpool, Southport and Preston Junction Railway to provide a connection to the CLC line, joining it at Altcar and Hillhouse. These lines ultimately proved uncompetitive, however, and the Southport services were withdrawn in January 1952.

In July 1897, both the West Lancashire and the Liverpool, Southport and Preston Junction Railways were absorbed into the Lancashire and Yorkshire Railway (L&Y). The L&Y had a large terminus at Southport Chapel Street and could see no sense in operating two termini at very close proximity. On 1 May 1901, the L&Y completed a remodelling of the approach lines to Southport Central to allow trains to divert onto the Manchester to Southport line and into Southport Chapel Street Station. Southport Central was closed to passengers, and it became a goods depot, eventually amalgamating with Chapel Street depot. It survived intact well into the 1970s.

In 1904, the line from Liverpool was electrified by the L&YR, which also extended the third rail out as far as Crossens on the WLR line to Preston that year and out to Meols Cop in 1909.

In 1914, the station was enlarged taking in the land to the side of London Street which involved demolishing the former ELR station, the London Street excursion platforms were built about the same time (although called London Street, they were actually platforms belonging to Chapel Street station).

The Preston line was closed to passengers on 7 September 1964, although a small section to Hesketh Park station was used for freight until 1967. This line had its electric local services to Crossens and its through steam services withdrawn on consecutive days immediately before the official closure date - the only such route to suffer that fate during the Beeching-era closures. Nowadays, the towns of Southport and Preston are linked only by the (largely dual-carriageway) A565 and A59 roads.

At its largest, Chapel Street station had eleven regular platforms and two excursion platforms. Now six truncated platforms are in use (1-3 for Liverpool trains and 4-6 for Manchester), the rest having been demolished and the land used for car parking. In 1970, the former terminal building was replaced with a shopping centre. Platform 7 was originally going to be retained and used for excursions for when main line specials were to visit the resort, but this failed; it, too, was demolished along with platforms 8, 9 and 10.

Remains of the signal box, carriage & wagon works & substation are still visible today. The sidings next to the former South Curve still remain today but are not much used except for if a unit or engine needs turning.

A new M to Go shop opened in 2007, incorporating a ticket office, and the station itself underwent a £3.5 million renovation project; it included a renewed roof, new lighting, glazed screens, floor tiles and toilets, plus a retail unit.

=== Historical services ===
The Monday to Saturday service pattern underwent a major revamp at the May 2018 timetable change, with the loss of all direct trains to Bolton and Manchester Piccadilly, except for two morning peak trains to Alderley Edge. The basic pattern was two trains per hour to Manchester Victoria, via Wigan Wallgate and Atherton, which then continued to Rochdale and then alternately to Blackburn via the East Lancashire Line or Leeds via Brighouse. Travellers for destinations on the south side of Manchester, such as Manchester Airport or Stockport, had to change at Hindley or Salford Crescent. On Sundays, there was an hourly service to Blackburn, via Wigan Wallgate and Manchester Victoria.

From the winter 2019 timetable change, all trains were routed via Bolton off-peak and serving both main Manchester terminals: one ran to Alderley Edge via Manchester Piccadilly and Stockport, whilst the other runs to Manchester Victoria and onward to Stalybridge. Direct services to stations on the Atherton line no longer run, and passengers wishing to travel towards Rochdale and further east have to change at Wigan Wallgate. The Sunday service pattern remained unchanged, with the hourly service to Manchester and Blackburn running via Atherton. Connections for Westhoughton and Bolton can be made at Hindley.

From the December 2022 timetable change, services to Alderley Edge ended and now terminate at Manchester Oxford Road.

== Facilities ==
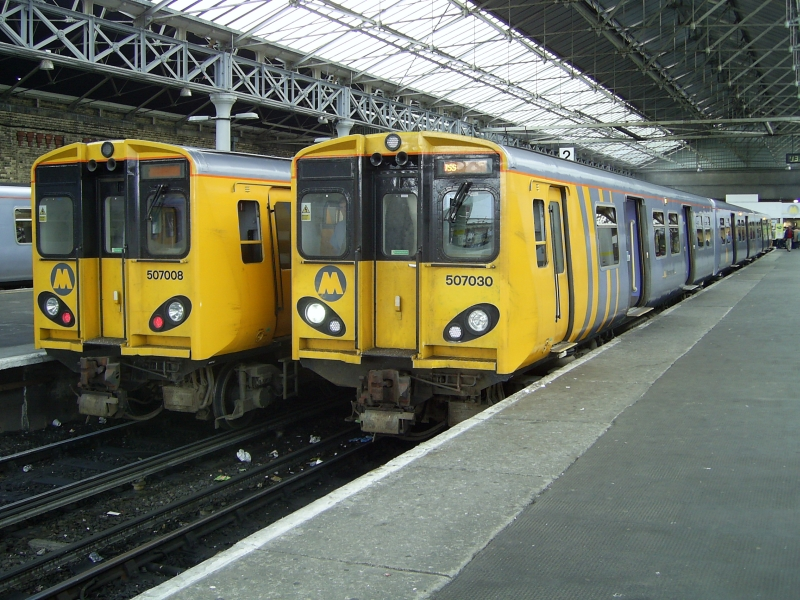
Two Merseyrail Class 507 electric multiple units stand at platforms 2 and 3

The main entrance to this staffed station is located on the pedestrianised Chapel Street, one of Southport's main shopping areas. The car park immediately next to the station is reserved for taxis and staff only, but a large pay car park further along London Street is available for general public use.

The station is staffed 15 minutes before the first service and 15 minutes after the last service. There are toilets and platform CCTV, with a Mtogo shop and booking office. There are departure and arrival screens on the platform for passenger information. There are 16 bicycle racks and secure storage for 80 bicycles.

== Services ==
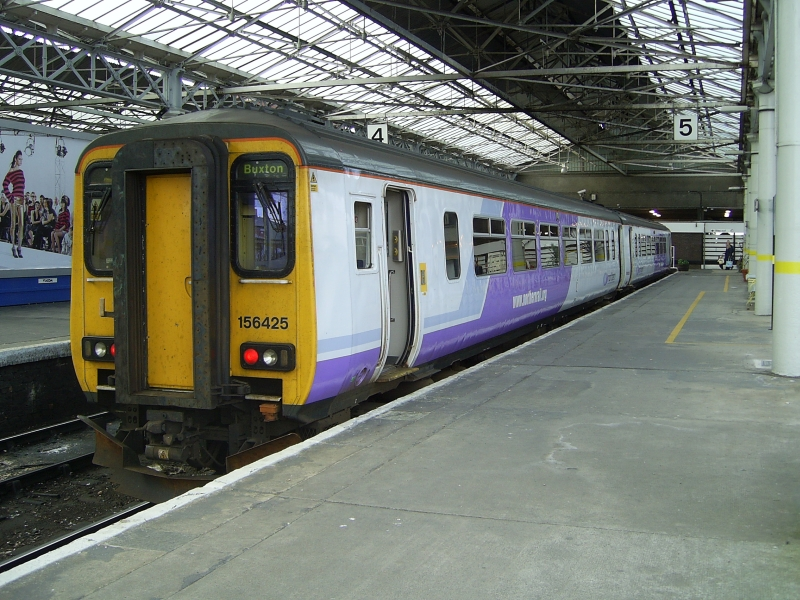
A Northern Rail Class 156 diesel multiple unit stands at platform 5

Southport is served by two train operating companies, with the following general off-peak service pattern in trains per hour (tph):

Merseyrail:

- 4 tph to Liverpool Central.

Northern Trains:

- 1 tph to Manchester Oxford Road, via Bolton
- 1 tph to Stalybridge, via Manchester Victoria.

Preceding station	National Rail	Following station
Terminus	Merseyrail; Northern Line	Birkdale towards Liverpool Central
Terminus	Northern Trains; Manchester Victoria-Southport or Manchester Oxford Rd-Southport	Meols Cop towards Wigan Wallgate
	Historical railways	
Terminus	Lancashire and Yorkshire Railway; Manchester and Southport Railway	St Luke's; Line open, station closed
Terminus	Lancashire and Yorkshire Railway; West Lancashire Railway	St Luke's; Line open, station closed
Terminus	Lancashire and Yorkshire Railway; Liverpool, Southport and Preston Junction Railway	St Luke's; Line open, station closed
