= West Lancashire Railway =

Disused railway in England

Overview
- Locale: Lancashire; Merseyside
- Termini: Southport; Preston

History
- Work began: April 18, 1873
- Completed: September 16, 1882
- Taken-over by L&YR: 1 July 1897
- Closed for freight: 6 April 1964
- Closed for passengers: 7 September 1968

Technical
- Track gauge: 1,435 mm (4 ft 8 1/2 in) standard gauge

The West Lancashire Railway ran from Southport to Preston in northwest England. It opened in stages between 1878 and 1882. The line became part of the Lancashire & Yorkshire Railway in 1897.

== Authorisation ==
West Lancashire Railway Act 1871
- Act of Parliament
- Parliament of the United Kingdom
- Long title: An Act for the making and maintaining of the West Lancashire Railway; and for other purposes.
- Citation: 34 & 35 Vict. c. cc

Dates
- Royal assent: 14 August 1871

Text of statute as originally enacted

West Lancashire Railway Act 1872
- Act of Parliament
- Parliament of the United Kingdom
- Long title: An Act for conferring further powers on the West Lancashire Railway Company for the construction of works and the raising of money, and otherwise in relation to their Undertaking.
- Citation: 35 & 36 Vict. clxxxiii

Dates
- Royal assent: 6 August 1872

Text of statute as originally enacted

West Lancashire Railway Act 1875
- Act of Parliament
- Parliament of the United Kingdom
- Long title: An Act for conferring further powers on the West Lancashire Railway Company for the construction of works and the raising of money, and otherwise in relation to their Undertaking.
- Citation: 38 & 39 Vict. c. clxxxii

Dates
- Royal assent: 2 August 1875

Text of statute as originally enacted

Southport was served by railways from Liverpool, the Liverpool, Crosby and Southport Railway (LC&SR) opening in 1848 and from Manchester, the Manchester and Southport Railway (M&SR) opening in 1851, by 1859 both of these railways had become part of the Lancashire and Yorkshire Railway (L&YR) putting them in a monopoly position.

The West Lancashire Railway (WLR) was promoted by Southport interests who sought to break this monopoly and provide a shorter route between the two towns than via Burscough. (Note: It was possible to travel by rail from Southport to Preston by taking the L&YR line to Burscough Junction and changing trains.) The bill presented to Parliament named Thomas Powys, 4th Baron Lilford, Sir Thomas George Fermor Hesketh, John Randolphus de Trafford, (all local land owners) Lawrence Catlow Spencer, Walter Smith (former railway contractor and Mayor of Southport) and Samuel Boothroyd (local businessman) as subscribers. (Note: A proposal for an act of Parliament is known as a bill in the UK.)

Parliament had reservations about the proposal when the bill was presented in 1870, particularly about sharing the already congested Preston station, changes were made and a successful bill was presented in 1871. The West Lancashire Railway Act 1871 (34 & 35 Vict. c. cc) establishing the company received royal assent on 14 August 1871.

The first chairman of the railway company was Sir Thomas George Fermor Hesketh who served from authorisation until he died in 1872. He was succeeded by Albert Ricardo who held the post until 1876.

During 1876, Edward Holden (1835–1913), the younger son of Sir Isaac Holden (1807–1897) and owner of the Southport Daily News joined the board, he agreed to assist financing the railway from his personal fortune, it is likely he provided funds occasionally to keep the company out of trouble. Holden was elected as the Company Chairman on 20 November 1876, he held this position throughout most of the company's existence. (Note: Holden had business interests in Southport Winter Gardens, Victoria swimming baths and the Glacarium ice-skating rink.)

== Construction ==
James Brunlees and Charles Douglas Fox were appointed to supervise the lines construction, although the works were supervised by Mr. P. Thursby. (Note: Cotterall (1982) states that Mr C.D. Fox was the engineer and makes no mention of James Brunlees) A contract was let for the first part of the construction work with Clarke, Punshard and Company. The first sod was cut by Alderman Samuel Swire, the Mayor of Southport, on 18 April 1873, and construction began, but petered-out within a few months when Clarke, Punshard and Company found themselves in financial difficulties, no progress was made for nearly three years.

In 1876, after Edward Holden had joined the board, funds became available again and construction was re-commenced with the letting of a new contract with Barnes & Squire. Much of the line under construction at the start was through areas of peat and George Stephenson's technique of floating the line, as used at Chat Moss, was employed, in this case using 'timber rafts'.

In 1877 the works became bogged down in heavy clay and the company decided to purchase a mechanical excavator, a steam navvy, from Ruston, Proctor and Company that facilitated the remaining work.

The River Douglas was bridged in 1882, in order to facilitate the passage of steam boats the river needed to be widened and deepened before the swing bridge could be built, the bridge was built on 24 cylindrical piles sunk into the river bed and filled with concrete. Building the bridge was facilitated by the construction of a temporary wooden bridge with a single line of rails and an opening section to allow the passage of river traffic.

The final major piece of civil engineering was the bridge over the River Ribble which also opened in 1882. Considerable preparatory work needed undertaking before the bridge could be built, Preston Corporation stipulated an 80 feet (24 m) wide excavation, taken down to a depth of 10 feet (3.0 m) into the sandstone rock, for the full width of the river. This added considerably to the construction costs and completion time.

There was a further set back for a period of some weeks when the river flooded on 31 July 1881. This was due to a combination of a series of heavy downpours and a high tide, which caused the Ribble to rise 8 feet (2.4 m) above its normal high-water level. One of the coffer-dams close to the middle of the stream gave way fortunately nobody was working there that day, much the same thing occurred again on 10 August 1881.

This bridge was 45 feet (14 m) high with five 60 feet (18 m) iron spans on six piers of Longridge stone, there was one pier on each bank and four in the river, the bridge curved at the Preston end and ran onto a stone viaduct of twelve arches into the station.

Connections were made with L&YR south of the River Ribble in 1883 via four junctions, the first two being a triangular junction on the east side of the WLR mainline at Ribble junction and Penwortham junction that converged at Middleforth junction then crossed under the 6 tracks of the North Union Railway via a new underbridge 172 feet (52 m) wide that had to be constructed without disturbing that line's traffic. Then line then turned southwards to join the L&YR line between Preston and Blackburn (the former East Lancashire Railway "Preston Extension") at Whitehouse (later Whitehouse South) junction. These junctions were authorised by the West Lancashire Railway Act 1872 (35 & 36 Vict. clxxxiii). The same Act gave the WLR running powers over the L&YR to Blackburn to enable through services.

== Opening ==
There were celebrations when the first section of the railway opened, two trains, one after the other, full of VIPs left Hesketh Park, which had been decorated with a triumphal arch and flags, to speeches and tunes played by the band of the local Rifle Volunteers.

The line opened in stages:

- The 6 miles 50 chains (10.7 km) Hesketh Park to Hesketh Bank and Tarleton opened on 20 February 1878 with stations at Churchtown, Crossens and Banks, Hundred End station opened later in the year. (Note: Railways in the United Kingdom are, for historical reasons, measured in miles and chains. A chain is 22 yards (20 m) long, there are 80 chains to the mile. Occasionally furlongs are also used, there are 10 chains to the furlong.)
- A southern extension from Hesketh Park to a temporary terminus at Southport Windsor Road opened on 10 June 1878.
- A 15 chains (300 m) extension from Hesketh Bank and Tarleton to River Douglas station on the banks of the River Douglas opened on 13 July 1878.
- The 2 miles 45 chains (4.1 km) from River Douglas to Longton with a station at Hoole opened on 18 May 1882.
- The southern section from Southport Windsor Road, now re-named Southport Ash Street to Southport Central officially opened on16 September 1882 but opened unofficially on 4 September 1882 for Preston Guild week, though the Southport terminus was incomplete.
- The northern section including the bridge over the River Ribble from Longton to Preston officially opened on 16 September 1882 but opened unofficially on 4 September 1882 for Preston Guild week, though the Preston terminus was incomplete. (Note: At the time the Preston terminus was called Preston, the term Fishergate Hill may have been in popular use but was not officially applied until after passenger services had finished.) An intermediate station was opened at Howick on 1 June 1889.

With the completed line about to open there were further celebrations with a 'special' express train ride through the full length of the line and back followed by a banquet and speeches for the directors and supporters.

- The triangular junction connections south of Preston, the link under the North Union Railway and Whitehouse junction onto the L&YR opened on 16 April 1883.
- After they had taken over the L&YR opened two further links:
  - the first creating Whitehouse West and North junctions that enabled trains from Southport to access Preston station so that they could close Preston Fishergate Hill to passengers in 1900.
  - the second involved the remodelling of the station approaches in Southport so that passenger trains were taken into Southport Chapel Street station, Southport Central closed to passengers on 1 May 1901.

== Operations ==
=== Services ===
When Hesketh Bank to Hesketh Park opened in 1878 the company ran twelve trains a day along the length of the line with an extra service late on Saturdays, there were four trains each way on Sundays. There were an additional ten round trips from Hesketh Park to Crossens and a further two to Banks.

Omnibuses were provided between Hesketh Park and the company's offices in London Street. The omnibuses, of which there were two that had been specially built for the railway, provided the service from Southport Windsor Road when that station opened on 10 June 1878 but it didn't last very long being withdrawn at the end of October 1878.

Some of these rail services were quickly withdrawn due to a lack of passengers, all of the additional Crossens and one of the Banks services succumbed.

When the full line was open, from September 1882 there were 15 trains daily in each direction, with 5 on Sundays, the average journey took 45 minutes.

By 1895 the service consisted of 14 daily trains in each direction with 2 extra services on Saturdays, 4 of the daily trains continued on to Blackburn, Sundays had six services each way, 3 of which continued to Blackburn.

=== River Douglas dock ===
A landing stage was built adjacent to River Douglas station. Goods arriving by water were initially unloaded onto the temporary wooden bridge crossing the river that had been constructed in 1877 to facilitate the building of the swing bridge. The temporary structure had a platform to unload goods onto. A 5-ton steam-driven crane was installed in 1878 and used to unload goods directly from barges into railway wagons.

In 1879 goods traffic started to arrive by sea at the wharf adjacent to River Douglas station, at lease two schooners landed loads of Welsh slate for onward transportation by rail. The temporary bridge was not completely removed until after the line opened throughout in 1882.

=== Inland waterways ===
The railway had a working relationship with the Leeds and Liverpool Canal company from the beginning, the first coal barge for the railway from Wigan arriving at Tarleton lock on 10 September 1878 then being unloaded adjacent to River Douglas station.

In March 1879 the WLR started to ship coal along the canal and onto the River Douglas in its own steam barges, it had five of these in operation by November 1879, these were supplemented by privately owned barges when required. Marshall (1969) comments that "the freight rates must have been extraordinarily low to make this route competetive against the L&YR" with its direct rail link.

=== Maritime activities ===
In 1878 the WLR set itself up to provide shipping services via the West Lancashire Railway (Steam Vessels) Act 1878 (41 & 42 Vict. c. xxxi) which received royal assent on 16 April 1878. The Act enabled the company to:

build, purchase, hire, provide, charter, employ and maintain steam vessels to carry passengers, livestock and goods from Hesketh-with-Becconsall on the River Douglas to Preston, Lytham St Annes, Blackpool, Fleetwood, Barrow in Furness, the Isle of Man and to anywhere on the Leeds and Liverpool Canal.

West Lancashire Railway (Steam Vessels) Act 1878
- Act of Parliament
- Parliament of the United Kingdom
- Long title: An Act for empowering the West Lancashire Railway Company to provide and use Steam and other Vessels; and for other purposes.
- Citation: 41 & 42 Vict. c. xxxi

Dates
- Royal assent: 16 April 1878
Other legislation
Amended by	West Lancashire Railway Act 1881

Text of statute as originally enacted

The company purchased a paddle steamer named Virginia in June 1878. The Virginia had been built in Great Yarmouth in 1875 and had operated a passenger service along the River Yare between Yarmouth and Norwich. The Virginia was a single-masted iron paddle steamer of 46 tons, 87 feet (27 m) long and 12 feet (3.7 m) wide fitted with two diagonal direct compound engines.

The Virginia started operations in August 1878 conducting round trips to Lytham and occasional excursions to Naze Point in the River Ribble from the landing stage adjacent to River Douglas station which had connecting 'special express' train services. Services continued regularly, except Sundays, until mid October 1878. The service made a loss over the season but the directors felt there had not been enough time for a fair trial.

The following year the sailing season was started on 11 April with excursions along the River Douglas, followed by sailings to Lytham starting on 19 April. The last advertised services were for the 29 and 30 August 1879. Another loss was reported on the season and the service was withdrawn.

=== Tarleton branch ===
By July 1880 a branch was opened from the line on the eastern side of Hesketh Bank to Tarleton Lock where the Rufford Branch of the Leeds and Liverpool Canal ran into the River Douglas. There was already an interchange wharf at the lock between canal barges and sea-going craft, now they were joined by the railway who were transporting goods arriving by water onwards to Southport by rail.

West Lancashire Railway Act 1881
- Act of Parliament
- Parliament of the United Kingdom
- Long title: An Act to enable the West Lancashire Railway Company to purchase certain lands in the county of Lancaster and a branch railway or siding known as the Tarleton Branch Railway to raise further moneys and to confer further powers in relation to their undertaking on the Company and for other purposes.
- Citation: 44 & 45 Vict. c. lvii

Dates
- Royal assent: 3 June 1881

Text of statute as originally enacted

The branch was privately built and the WLR and retrospectively authorised in 1881 by the West Lancashire Railway Act 1881 (44 & 45 Vict. c. lvii).

== Rolling stock ==
The lines first Superintendent of rolling stock was Jack Willgoose until he retired in 1888, he was succeeded by John Edmondson who came from the Manchester, Sheffield and Lincolnshire Railway, he stayed in the post until the L&YR take-over. (Note: The first superintendent's name may be Willgoose (Cotterall 1982) or Wildgoose (Marshall 1972).)

=== Locomotives ===
The WLR and LS&PJR both had a varied fleet of locomotives, although separate companies they shared a lot of facilities and staff. Their locomotives were administered separately until December 1888 when they combined their locomotive stocks and operated a single stable.

The original WLR stable comprised three locomotives from Sharp, Stewart and Company to which were added:

- a Manning Wardle 0-6-0ST,
- five second-hand locomotives from the London, Brighton and South Coast Railway (LB&SCR),
- three Kitson and Company 0-4-0WT of a type usually used on street tramways,
- a used Manning Wardle 0-6-0 from the LB&SCR, and
- two 0-6-2T locomotives built by Beyer, Peacock and Company for the Manchester, Sheffield and Lincolnshire Railway

=== Coaching stock ===
For the opening of the railway the company bought 24 four-wheeled carriages from Ashbury Carriage Company. Twelve of which were first class with four compartments per coach and the others were five compartment coaches for third class which had cushioned seats, there was no second class provided. They were painted ultramarine blue below the waist with white upper panels and grey roofs.

The Ashbury coaches had clerestory roofs and were heated by radiators supplied with steam from the brake van which were equipped with boilers, it was innovative and appreciated by passengers.

In 1883 the railway was in need of more coaching stock and acquired 60 four-wheeled coaches, all built around 1860, from the LB&SCR, they were mainly third class with a few second class and four brake vans, they were used in their original brown LB&SCR livery.

When through running to Blackburn started one of the former LB&SCR second-class coach was sandwiched into the train to cater for the L&YR's customers.

In the early 1890s many of the former LB&SCR coaches had been laid aside or scrapped and new carriages were ordered from the Ashbury Carriage Company to replace them, 35 coaches were ordered, a mixture of classes and compartments, they were all delivered in 1893–1894.

=== Maintenance ===
Initial engine sheds were at Hesketh Park and Hesketh Bank, once the line was fully open these were closed and larger sheds provided near each terminus, the southern one at Southport Windsor Road and the northern one at Preston.

== Accidents ==
Whilst the line was under construction a labourer was killed in the Penwortham cutting.

There was one other significant accident during the railway's operation involving one of its trains on the L&YR line from Blackburn on 3 August 1896. A L&YR excursion from Leeds to Blackpool, had just started away from the ticket platform loop at Preston Junction station just as a West Lancashire Railway train from Blackburn to Preston was passing on the main line. The resulting sidelong collision damaged three coaches of the West Lancashire train, killing one passenger and injuring 7 others. The L&YR engine was damaged but its train was unscathed.

== Connections ==
It was realised from the beginning of the WLR that it needed to connect with other lines to widen the variety of available destinations and grow traffic. Even before the line was built, in 1873, the WLR tried to lease the whole undertaking to the Manchester, Sheffield and Lincolnshire Railway, its philosophy apparently being that they were not concerned who was running the line providing the L&YR hold on Southport was relaxed.

=== Liverpool, Southport and Preston Junction Railway ===
The Liverpool, Southport and Preston Junction Railway (LS&PJR) was approved in 1884 and opened in 1887. The line ran from a triangular junction with the WLR at Meols Cop to a junction with the Southport and Cheshire Lines Extension Railway (SCLER) at Altcar and Hillhouse

The LS&PJR was closely allied to the WLR, it shared several directors including the Chairman, Edward Holden, had the same secretary, Thomas Gilbert, had the same engineers, James Brunlees and Charles Douglas Fox and used the same office headquarters in Southport.

The LS&PJR and WLR both had a varied fleet of locomotives. Their locomotives were administered separately until December 1888 when they combined their locomotive stocks and operated a single stable.

The collapse of the Blackpool scheme, see below, and the reports that the railway was making a loss every half-yearly accounting period saw the company into receivership on 2 February 1889, Edward Holden, the chairman, was appointed as receiver and manager.

The LS&PJR was absorbed by the L&YR together with the WLR on 1 July 1897. The amalgamation was confirmed by the Lancashire and Yorkshire Railway Act 1897.

=== First Blackpool Railway proposal ===
A bill was presented to the 1883 session of Parliament proposing a line from Hesketh Bank to Blackpool crossing the River Ribble near Freckleton, (Note: The bill was for an independent company to be set up, some sources suggest it was a WLR sponsored bill, see for example Greville and Holt (1960), others suggest it was a Manchester, Sheffield and Lincolnshire Railway (MS&LR) proposal see for example Marshall (1969), a notice in the Railway Times over the signatures of the MS&LR chairman's and secretary's signatures would suggest that they sponsored it.) this scheme was withdrawn when it was opposed by Preston Corporation who had just taken over the Ribble Navigation Company and the Dock Branch Line and were preparing to build a new dock and improve the navigation. (Note: Under the authorisation of the Ribble Navigation and Preston Dock Act 1883 the corporation acquired the Preston Dock Navigation Company and the docks end of the Preston Dock Branch Line railway from the North Union Railway company in order to develop Preston as a major port diverting the river and creating a new dock basin.) This proposal was superseded by a combination of the WLR Preston Docks Extension and the Blackpool Railway which were both submitted to the 1884 Parliamentary session.

=== Dock extension line ===
The original Dock Branch line (also known as the Ribble Branch Line) was owned and built in 1846 jointly by the North Union Railway (NUR) and the Ribble Navigation Company, it ran from Preston station to Victoria Quay on the River Ribble. When authority for the diversion of the river and construction of a new dock was granted in 1883 the line was divided between the NUR (which subsequently became a L&NWR/L&YR joint railway) and the Navigation company. The dividing point was roughly at Strand Road.

West Lancashire Railway (Preston Docks Extension) Act 1884
- Act of Parliament
- Parliament of the United Kingdom
- Long title: An Act to enable the West Lancashire Railway Company to extend their railway to the Preston Docks in the county of Lancaster and to confer further powers in relation to their undertaking on the Company and for other purposes.
- Citation: 47 & 48 Vict. c. ccxxx

Dates
- Royal assent: 7 August 1884

Text of statute as originally enacted

In 1884, The WLR submitted a bill for a northern extension of its line to meet the Dock Branch Line. This proposed railway crossed the River Ribble using the existing WLR bridge then branched off before Preston Fishergate Hill station, crossing over Fishergate and the North Union Railway's Ribble Branch Line on bridges to join the Dock Branch line near the junction of Strand Road and Marsh Lane. This railway would give the WLR access to the docks, which were being expanded and it would form the joint first section of the proposed Blackpool Railway.

The West Lancashire Railway (Preston Docks Extension) Act 1884 (47 & 48 Vict. c. ccxxx) establishing the company received royal assent on 7 August 1884. No work was started on this scheme and it was abandoned when the Blackpool Railway ceased to be viable.

=== The Blackpool Railway ===
The MS&LR sponsored a bill for an independent company, The Blackpool Railway, which was authorised when the Blackpool Railway Act 1884 (47 & 48 Vict. c. ccxxiv) establishing the company received royal assent on 7 August 1884.

Blackpool Railway Act 1884
- Act of Parliament
- Parliament of the United Kingdom
- Long title: An Act for authorising the construction of a railway in Lancashire, to be called the Blackpool Railway; and for other purposes.
- Citation: 47 & 48 Vict. c. ccxxiv

Dates
- Royal assent: 7 August 1884

Text of statute as originally enacted

The dock extension line closely followed the route that the MS&LR planned to use as the first part of its projected Blackpool Railway, an agreement was made to jointly own the shared section. After connecting to the expanded dock railway the projected line continued via Lytham to Blackpool.

The first directors of the company were Nathaniel Eckersley, chairman of Wigan Junction Railways which was partly owned by the MS&LR, John Creemer Clarke of Abingdon, Henry Hall of Blackpool, Edward Watkin, chairman of the MS&LR and Edward Ross J.P., secretary of the MS&LR. The MS&LR were granted powers to work, manage and maintain the line

After receiving parliamentary authorisation the MS&LR started purchasing land that would be required for the railway. An extension of time to acquire the land and finances was sought in 1889 and an extension was granted until 1892, a further three year extension was granted in 1892. After these delays several land owners demanded that arbitrators be brought in to ensure fair prices were being paid, at this point, in order to protect itself, the MS&LR petitioned for the appointment of a receiver, which was granted.

A further extension was requested in the 1895 Parliamentary session, but there was significant opposition and the powers lapsed. The land was disposed of starting in 1896 as and when required and the MS&LR assured the L&YR and the London and North Western Railway (L&NWR) that they had abandoned their interest.

=== Wigan to Longton branch ===
To connect to the Blackpool Railway the MS&LR proposed to extend the Wigan Junction Railways (WJR) from Wigan to Longton, this was authorised under the Manchester, Sheffield and Lincolnshire Railway (Additional Powers) Act 1883, then use the WLR north to cross the River Ribble onto the proposed Blackpool Railway. The connecting WJR line also had the bonus of providing a route to Southport, thus covering the two most important west coast excursion destinations. When the MS&LR abandoned the Blackpool Railway, they considered this line redundant and abandoned it as well.

=== North West Central Railway ===
North West Central Railway 1890
- Act of Parliament
- Parliament of the United Kingdom
- Long title: An Act for the making and maintaining of the North West Central Railway and for other purposes.
- Citation: 53 & 54 Vict. c. ccxxviii

Dates
- Royal assent: 14 August 1890

Text of statute as originally enacted

One of the factors affecting the above decisions may have been the promotion of the North West Central Railway which gained authorisation when the North West Central Railway 1890 (53 & 54 Vict. c. ccxxviii) received royal assent on 14 August 1890. It was projected to run from Penwortham, just south of the River Ribble to a junction with the former Halifax, Thornton and Keighley Railway of the Great Northern Railway.

North West Central Railway (Abandonment) Act
- Act of Parliament
- Parliament of the United Kingdom
- Long title: An Act for the abandonment of the North West Central Railway
- Citation: 56 & 57 Vict. c. lxxxviii

Dates
- Royal assent: 29 June 1893

Text of statute as originally enacted

There was no work carried out on the project and it was declared abandoned by the passing of the North West Central Railway (Abandonment) 1893 (56 & 57 Vict. c. lxxxviii) on 29 June 1893.

== Receivership ==
A number of factors affected the profitability of the line but the crucial one was the lines inability to link effectively with other lines to grow its traffic.

The collapse of the attempts to provide connections left the WLR insolvent. On 31 July 1886 the Chancery Division was petitioned to appoint a receiver and manager, on 4 August 1886 the chairman, Edward Holden, was appointed as the receiver.

West Lancashire Railway Act 1894
- Act of Parliament
- Parliament of the United Kingdom
- Long title: An Act to reconstitute the Board of Directors of the West Lancashire Railway Company for raising further moneys and for other purposes.
- Citation: 57 & 58 Vict. c. clxxiii

Dates
- Royal assent: 17 August 1894

Text of statute as originally enacted

The West Lancashire Railway Act 1894 gave the company powers to reconstitute its board of directors and to capitalise all areas of interest then due to debenture holders.

== Lancashire and Yorkshire Railway ==
The various schemes to find alternative routes to Blackpool concerned the L&YR and it decided to ensure it had control of any future schemes by making the WLR and the LS&PJR an offer to take them over.

The possibility of a take over was discussed in January 1897 at the half-yearly general meeting of the WLR when it was stated that the company's net profit was increasing but not by enough for there to be a dividend paid in the foreseeable future. The shareholders eventually agreed to the proposed terms for a take-over by the L&YR.

Agreement to amalgamate was reached subject to the LSPJR also agreeing to be absorbed by the L&YR. The agreement rescinded the MS&LR running powers which finally removed any opportunity for the MS&LR to acquire an alternative route to Blackpool.

The Cheshire Lines Committee opposed the amalgamation but withdrew their objection when offered compensation of £1,500 annually (approximately £175,000 equivalent in 2026) for the loss of revenue from Liverpool to Preston traffic .

A problem arose when the issue was examined by a House of Lords select committee as the take-over would reinstate the L&YR monopoly, the reason for the WLR being built in the first place, they eventually decided that an amicable way out would be to grant the L&NWR running powers over the line. Although granted the L&NWR had not exercised their right by 1915.

Lancashire and Yorkshire Railway Act 1897
- Act of Parliament
- Parliament of the United Kingdom
- Long title: An Act for conferring further powers on the Lancashire and Yorkshire Railway Company to provide for the transfer to that Company of the undertakings of the West Lancashire Railway Company and the Liverpool Southport and Preston Junction Railway Company to repeal certain powers granted to the Manchester Sheffield and Lincolnshire Railway Company over those undertakings and the Lancashire and Yorkshire Railway and for other purposes
- Citation: 60 & 61 Vict. c. cххх

Dates
- Royal assent: 15 July 1897

Text of statute as originally enacted

The WLR along with the LS&PJR was to be absorbed from 1 July 1897 for an annual rent of £11,500 rising by annual increments to a maximum of £18,000 (approximately £1.3 million rising to £2 million equivalent in July 2026). The amalgamation was confirmed by the Lancashire and Yorkshire Railway Act 1897.

=== Lancashire and Yorkshire Railway modifications ===
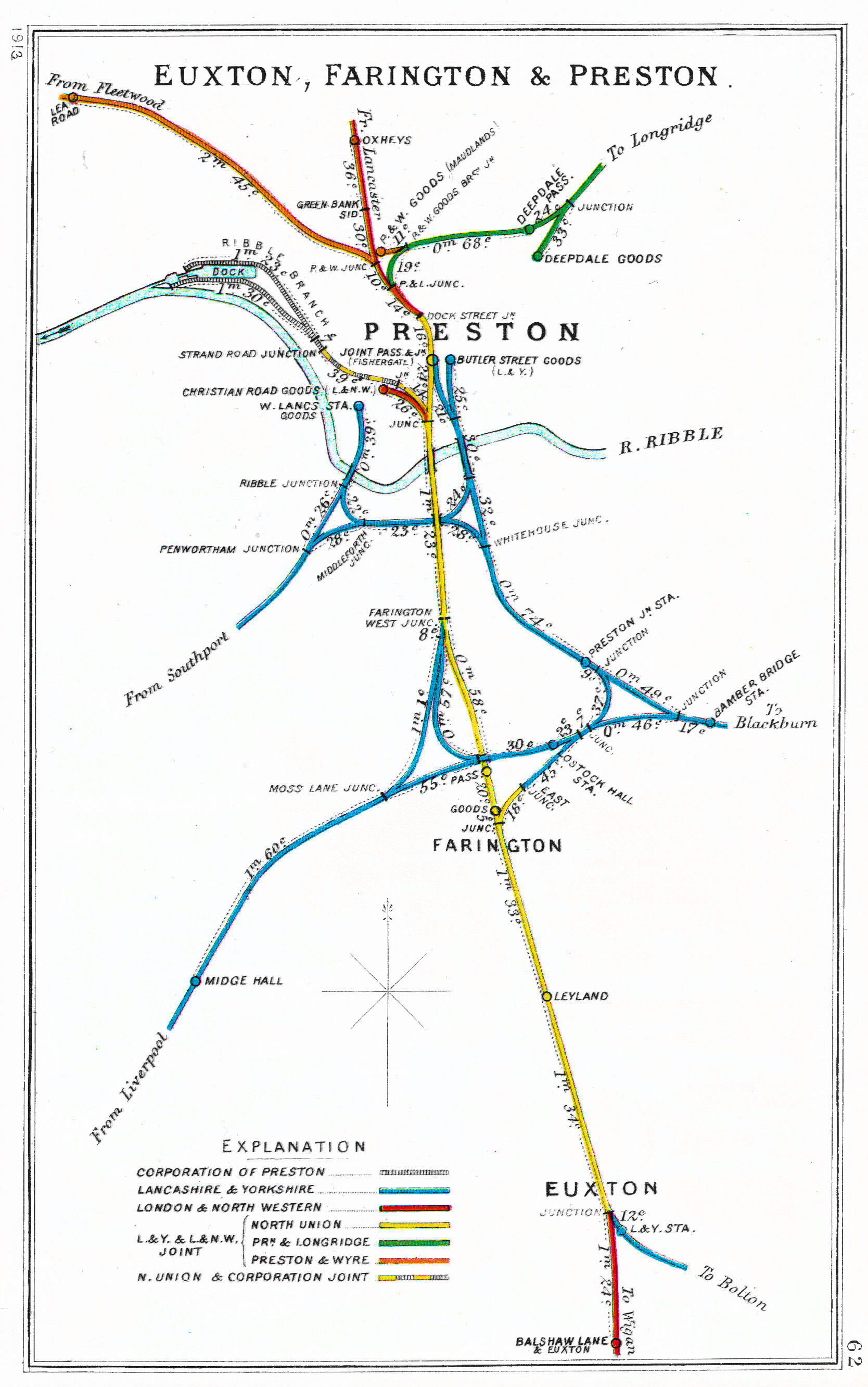
Railway Junction Diagram of railways around Preston in 1913

The L&YR assigned ten locomotives to operate the two lines, the WLR and the WLR, they immediately put in hand measures to relay the track and make other improvements.

The new owners built a west-to-north connecting chord at Whitehouse Junction which enabled them to redirect all of the WLR passenger trains into their own Preston (ELR) Station.

At the Southport end, passenger trains were rerouted into the adjacent L&YR's Chapel Street Station, with Southport Central closing on 1 April 1901 the old station re-opened on 10 March 1913 as Southport Kensington Road goods station.

To meet increasing demand for a suburban service into Preston the L&YR opened a station south of the River Ribble called Cop Lane or Cop Lane Halt on 17 April 1911. (Note: The two names, with and without 'Halt' seem to have been used interchangeably, and sometimes with a hyphen. Hindle (2022) suggests it was initially just called Cop Lane. Local newspapers say it was Cop Lane Halt. Gregson (2011) says that the London, Midland and Scottish Railway removed any ambiguity by renaming the station to Penwortham Cop Lane in 1940.)

=== Electrification ===
The L&YR electrified the commuter route from Liverpool Exchange to Southport with electric trains running from March 1904. By this time the Southport suburbs of Churchtown, Hesketh Park and Crossens had grown, potentially attracting a lot of commuter traffic. The L&YR decided to meet this demand by extending its electric train service from Southport on 5 April 1904.

Initially trains that ran to Crossens were non-stop from Liverpool to Southport then called at all stations between Southport and Crossens. From 15 February 1909, electrification was extended to Meols Cop from then on most electric trains on the former WLR terminated at Southport and Crossens calling at Meols Cop where they changed direction, reversing back out and taking the other side of the triangle of lines back onto the former WLR.

From 1924 some of the services were operated using twelve 45 ft (14 m) lightweight composite single power cars, usually known as orange boxes, that had been built for the Southport to Dingle service over the Liverpool Overhead Railway and had become redundant when that service was withdrawn in 1914, they were then used on the Gladstone Dock local service until 1924 when that ceased, they could still be seen on the Crossens service as late as 1945.

== Closure ==
Hundred End station closed in 1962. Passenger services, including the electric ones, ceased in September 1964 (as a result of the Beeching Axe) and most of the line was closed. The line was lifted beyond Hesketh Park in 1965.

A goods service to Hesketh Park continued until November 1967, and the remaining track was lifted in late 1968- though a small stump remained in place as far as Roe Lane in Southport until the very early 1970s as part of the complex of Meols Cop electric depot.

== Sources ==
- Baker, Michael H.C. (1990). Railways to the Coast: Britain’s Seaside Lines Past and Present. ISBN 978-1-85260-058-7.
- Bailey, F.A. (1992) [1955]. A history of Southport : reprinted to mark the bi-centenary of Southport (1792-1992). Sefton Council. ISBN 1874516006.
- Baxter, Bertram (1982a). Baxter, David (ed.). British Locomotive Catalogue 1825–1923. Vol. 3B: Lancashire and Yorkshire Railway and its constituent companies. Ashbourne, Derbyshire: Moorland Publishing Company. ISBN 0-903485-85-0.
- Beeching, Richard (1963). "The Reshaping of British Railways" (PDF). HMSO.
- Biddle, G. (1989). The Railways Around Preston - A Historical Review. Scenes from the past. Vol. 6. Foxline. ISBN 1-870119-05-3.Publication has no page numbers.
- Bradshaw, George (2011) [December 1895]. Bradshaw's Rail Times for Great Britain and Ireland December 1895: A Reprint of the Classic Timetable Complete with Period Advertisements and Shipping Connections to All Parts. Midhurst: Middleton Press. ISBN 978-1-908174-11-6. OCLC 832579861.
- Brown, Joe (2021). Liverpool & Manchester Railway Atlas. Manchester: Crécy Publishing. ISBN 9780860936879. OCLC 1112373294.
- Cotterall, J.E. (1982). The West Lancashire Railway. Oakwood. ISBN 0-85361-288-9.
- Dixon, John; Gilmour, John (March 2002). "West Lancashire Railway Mysteries Unravelled" (PDF). Railway and Canal Historical Society Journal. 34 Part 1 (181): 4–16. Archived from the original (PDF) on 20 January 2025.
- Dow, George (1985) [1962]. Great Central, Volume Two: Dominion of Watkin 1864–1899. Shepperton: Ian Allan. ISBN 978-0-7110-1469-5. OCLC 655324061.
- Ellis, Cuthbert Hamilton (1965). Railway carriages in the British Isles : from 1830 to 1914. London: George Allen & Unwin. OCLC 923592.
- Gahan, John W. (1982). Seventeen Stations to Dingle: the Liverpool Overhead Railway remembered. ISBN 0-907768-20-2.
- Grant, Donald J. (2017). Directory of the Railway Companies of Great Britain (1st ed.). Kibworth Beauchamp, Leicestershire: Troubador Publishing Ltd. ISBN 978-1-78803-768-6.
- Gregson, Bob (2011). The Lancashire and Yorkshire railway around Preston : a history of the East and West Lancashire sections including Lostock Hall. Preston: Atkinson Publications. ISBN 978-0-9565-1845-3. OCLC 1345565762.
- Greville, M.D.; Holt, G.O. (March 1960). "Railway Development in Preston—2" (PDF). The Railway Magazine. Vol. 106, no. 707. pp. 197–203. Archived from the original on 19 December 2013.
- Greville, M.D. (1981). Chronology of the Railways of Lancashire and Cheshire (Revised and Combined ed.). Railway & Canal Historical Society. ISBN 0-901461-30-X.
- Harris, Michael (1997). "Train heating". In Simmons, Jack; Biddle, Gordon (eds.). The Oxford Companion to British Railway History From 1603 to the 1990s (1st ed.). Oxford: Oxford University Press. pp. 535–536. ISBN 0-19-211697-5.
- Hindle, David John (2022). Lament for a Branch Line: The Preston to Southport Railway (2nd Enlarged ed.). Silver Link Books. ISBN 978 1 85794 609 3.
- Hoole, Ken (1982). Trains in Trouble. Vol. 3. Atlantic. ISBN 0-906899-05-2.
- Holt, Geoffrey O.; Biddle, Gordon (1986). The North West. A Regional history of the railways of Great Britain. Vol. 10 (2nd ed.). David St. John Thomas. ISBN 978-0-946537-34-1. OCLC 643506870.
- Jacobs, Gerald (2009). "Railway Mileages". In Bridge, Mike (ed.). TRACKatlas of Mainland Britain. Bradford on Avon: Trackmaps. ISBN 978-0-9549866-5-0.
- Marsden, Colin (2008). The DC Electrics. Hersham: Oxford Publishing. ISBN 978-0-86093-615-2.
- Marshall, John (1969). The Lancashire & Yorkshire Railway. Vol. 1. Newton Abbot: David & Charles. ISBN 978-0-7153-4352-4.
- Marshall, John (1970). The Lancashire & Yorkshire Railway. Vol. 2. Newton Abbot: David & Charles. ISBN 978-0-7153-4906-9.
- Marshall, John (1972). The Lancashire & Yorkshire Railway. Vol. 3. Newton Abbot: David & Charles. ISBN 978-0-7153-5320-2.
- Quick, Michael (2023) [2001]. Railway passenger stations in Great Britain: a chronology (PDF). version 5.05. Railway & Canal Historical Society.
- Wright, Paul (2008). Lost Termini of North West England. Disused Stations: Closed Railway Stations in the UK. ISBN 978-1-85794-316-0.
- Wright, Paul (2011). Lost Stations of North West England. Disused Stations: Closed Railway Stations in the UK. ISBN 978-1-85794-371-9.
