= Southport Central railway station =

Former railway station in England

Southport Central

General information
- Location: Southport, Sefton; England
- Coordinates: 53.6461°N 2.9972°W
- Grid reference: SD342171
- Platforms: 2

Other information
- Status: Disused

History
- Original company: West Lancashire Railway
- Pre-grouping: Lancashire and Yorkshire Railway
- Post-grouping: London, Midland and Scottish Railway

Key dates
- 4 September 1882: Station temporarily opened
- 16 September 1882: Station fully opened
- 1 May 1901: Station closed
- 10 March 1913: Station reopened as Kensington Road goods station
- 3 December 1973: closed completely
Location

Southport Central was the Southport terminus railway station of the West Lancashire Railway in Lancashire, England, it opened in September 1882. The station continued as the terminus when the Lancashire and Yorkshire Railway took the West Lancashire over, surviving until May 1901 when passenger services were transferred to Southport Chapel Street. The station reopened as a goods station in 1913.

== Passenger station ==
The West Lancashire Railway (WLR) opened its line between Southport and Preston in stages starting from the centre and working towards the terminals. The southern terminus was firstly Hesketh Park in February 1878 then to a temporary terminus at Southport Windsor Road (which later became Southport Ash Street) which opened in June 1878.

Southport Central became the Southport terminus railway station in September 1882, initially opening on a temporary basis on 4 September 1882 to provide services for passengers attending the Preston Guild, a major event that only happened every 20 years. The station opened fully on 16 September 1882.

The station was located at the junction of Derby Road and Kensington Road. (Note: Its location on Derby Road has led to some sources using Southport Derby Road as an alternative name, but there is no evidence to show this was official.)

The station was an imposing building designed by the architect Charles Driver in a Gothic style, it contained a 40 by 34 feet (12 by 10 m) booking hall, a secretary's office and a stationmaster's residence on the second floor. It was built in grey dressed stone with blind arcading within. The corner of the building had a distinctive tower with arched entrances underneath.

There were two platforms, one for arrivals and one for departures, they were 400 feet (120 m) long covered by a shorter, 220 feet (67 m) glazed roof of 70 feet (21 m) span which was supported on twenty-seven wrought-iron pillars.

An accident occurred at the station on 1 November 1882 when several iron girders which being fixed in place to support the trainshed glazed roof collapsed damaging two carriages on the tracks beneath.

The station became the terminus of the Liverpool, Southport and Preston Junction Railway (LS&PJR) when it opened on 2 September 1887. The WLR and the LS&PJR, although nominally independent, were closely related sharing the same directors, engineers, secretary, offices and now terminus. The LS&PJR ran passenger services to Barton and goods further afield through its connection to the Southport and Cheshire Lines Extension Railway.

Whilst the station was mainly for passengers it had a goods yard to the east of the passenger station, north of the running lines. This had a one-track goods shed and was able to accommodate most types of goods including live stock, it was equipped with a five ton crane. Just beyond the goods shed was a two-track engine shed accessed via a turntable.

Southport Central closed to passengers on 1 May 1901 after the tracks into Southport Chapel Street were remodelled and passenger services were transferred there.

== Goods station ==
The station remained closed until 10 March 1913 when it reopened as Kensington Road Goods station, on the same site in the same building.

The main building had two tracks and there was a small goods yard to the north of the access tracks, to the south of the tracks and building was coal yard. The goods yard was able to accommodate most types of goods including live stock and was equipped with a ten-ton crane.

It remained in use as a goods depot until 3 December 1973.

The old station has subsequently been demolished and is now a supermarket car park.

Preceding station	Disused railways	Following station
Terminus	Lancashire and Yorkshire Railway; West Lancashire Railway	Southport Ash Street; Line and station closed
Terminus	Lancashire and Yorkshire Railway; Liverpool, Southport and Preston Junction Railway	Southport Ash Street; Line and station closed

== Bibliography ==
- Biddle, Gordon (1981). Railway stations in the north west : a pictorial history. Clapham, N. Yorkshire: Dalesman. OCLC 1151104080.
- Brown, Joe (2021). Liverpool & Manchester Railway Atlas. Manchester: Crécy Publishing. ISBN 9780860936879. OCLC 1112373294.
- Cotterall, J.E. (1982). The West Lancashire Railway. Oakwood. ISBN 0-85361-288-9.
- Greville, M.D. (1981). Chronology of the Railways of Lancashire and Cheshire (Revised and Combined ed.). Railway & Canal Historical Society. ISBN 0-901461-30-X.
- Marshall, John (1969). The Lancashire & Yorkshire Railway. Vol. 1. Newton Abbot: David & Charles. ISBN 978-0-7153-4352-4.
- Oliver, Henry; Airey, John (1894). Hand-book and Appendix of Stations, Junctions, Sidings, Collieries, &c., on the Railways in United Kingdom.
- Quick, Michael (2023) [2001]. Railway passenger stations in Great Britain: a chronology (PDF). version 5.05. Railway & Canal Historical Society.
- Shannon, Paul; Hillmer, John (2004). West, East and North Lancashire. British Railways Past and Present 43. Great Addington: Past & Present Publishing. ISBN 978-1-85895-237-6.
- The Railway Clearing House (1938). Official Hand-book of Railway Stations 1938. London: The Railway Clearing House.
