= Preston Fishergate Hill railway station =

Former railway station in England

Preston

General information
- Other names: Preston Fishergate Hill
- Location: Preston, Lancashire; England
- Coordinates: 53.7539°N 2.7146°W
- Grid reference: SD523289
- Platforms: 1

Other information
- Status: Disused

History
- Original company: West Lancashire Railway
- Pre-grouping: Lancashire and Yorkshire Railway
- Post-grouping: London, Midland and Scottish Railway

Key dates
- 4 September 1882: Passenger station temporarily opened
- 16 September 1882: Passenger station fully opened as Preston
- 15 February 1883: Goods station opened
- 16 July 1900: Station closed
- 1 September 1902: Station re-opened for goods only
- c. 1904: Renamed as Preston Fishergate Hill
- 25 January 1965: Station closed completely
Location

Preston Fishergate Hill was a railway station at the bottom of Fishergate Hill in Preston. It formed the northeastern terminus of the West Lancashire Railway which built a direct railway link between Southport and Preston.

== Passenger station ==
The West Lancashire Railway (WLR) opened its line between Southport and Preston in stages starting from the centre and working towards the terminals.

Preston became the northern terminus railway station in September 1882, initially opening on a temporary basis on 4 September 1882 to provide services for passengers attending the Preston Guild, a major event that only happened every 20 years. The station opened fully on 16 September 1882.

The station was located at the bottom of Fishergate Hill, between Elm Street and Beech Street. The station was designed by the architect Charles Driver in a Gothic style, it contained a 40 by 20 feet (12.2 by 6.1 m) booking hall, waiting room, refreshment room and offices. The external walls were faced with pitch-faced coursed blue and brown parpoints from Halifax. (Note: Parpoint is the Yorkshire local word equivalent for perpend, a brick or stone that has its longest dimension perpendicular to the face of a wall, especially one that extends through the wall's entire thickness. The dictionary definition of perpend at Wiktionary)

There was one platform with a single track on each side, it was sheltered with a 240 feet (73 m) long glazed roof.

Whilst operating as a passenger station there was also a goods yard at a lower level that opened on15 February 1883. It was to the west of the running lines, it had several sidings, a single line goods shed and a cattle dock, it was equipped with a ten-ton crane. On the opposite side of the running lines was a two-road engine shed accessed by a turntable.

=== Services ===
When the full line was open, from September 1882 there were 15 trains daily in each direction, with 5 on Sundays, the average journey took 45 minutes.

Once the triangular junction connections south of Preston opened in April 1883 there were 16 trains per day arriving at the station from Southport Central of which 4 continued on to Blackburn, an additional train worked direct from Blackburn to Southport Central using the curve and not entering Preston. By 1887 all direct trains had ceased, they all called into Preston, those continuing on to Blackburn (or Southport Central in the other direction) were operated with only one locomotive by detaching the locomotive at the Preston ticket platform, the trains then worked by gravity into the station, the locomotive would then presumably follow the train and re-attach itself for the onward journey.

By 1895 the service consisted of 14 daily trains in each direction with 2 extra services on Saturdays, 4 of the daily trains continued on to Blackburn, Sundays had six services each way, 3 of which continued to Blackburn.

== Goods station ==
The Lancashire and Yorkshire Railway (L&YR) absorbed the WLR in 1897, they already had a major station in Preston and therefore had no need of this one, they built a new curve from Whitehouse West to Whitehouse North that provided access from the former WLR into the former ELR side of the joint L&NWR/L&YR Preston station. The station closed on 16 July 1900.

The station re-opened to goods traffic on 1 September 1902 but saw occasional passenger specials during the Preston Guild which is held every 20 years. The Suffix 'Fishergate Hill' being added around 1904. By the 1930's the central platform had been removed, the lower level sidings were used for cattle.

By 1961 the line into the station had been singled. Thereafter, the station remained open for goods traffic until 25 January 1965.

For many years after closure to passengers the premises were let by a firm of provender merchants for use as offices.

The station has since been demolished and housing now occupies the site.

Preceding station	Disused railways	Following station
Penwortham Cop Lane towards Southport	West Lancashire Railway	Terminus
