= Railway and Canal Historical Society =

- Formation: 4 September 1954; 71 years ago
- Founders: Bertram Baxter; Gordon Biddle; Charles Clinker; Ray Cook; Maurice Greville; Charles Hadfield in absentia; Geoffrey Holt in absentia; Kenneth Seaward
- Founded at: Grandmere Hotel, Preston
- Location: United Kingdom
- President: Gerald Leach
- Publication: Journal of the Railway and Canal Historical Society

The Railway and Canal Historical Society was founded in the United Kingdom in 1954 to bring together all those interested in the history of transport, with particular reference to railways and waterways in Britain, its main objects being to promote historical research and to raise the standard of published history.

== Activities ==
As the activities of the society increased, a more formal structure was needed, and it registered with Companies House on 14 November 1967 as a private company limited by guarantee with no share capital.

Journal of the Railway and Canal Historical Society
- Language: English

Publication details
- History: 1955–present
- Publisher: Railway and Canal Historical Society (United Kingdom)
- Frequency: Triannual

Standard abbreviations
- ISO 4: J. Railw. Canal Hist. Soc.

Indexing
- ISSN: 0033-8834
- OCLC no.: 637489628

Links
- Journal homepage; Journal index

The Journal of the Railway and Canal Historical Society, containing the results of original research, has been produced regularly since 1955. The Society also has a book publishing programme and aims to raise publishing standards by rewarding excellence. This has been achieved since 2004 by an annual awards ceremony, in which authors of leading works in the areas of railways, canals and transport are recognised. Winners receive a certificate, a silver cup, and a cash award funded by a bequest from publisher David St John Thomas. The Society also publishes an annual bibliography of transport history, partially in continuation of George Ottley's bibliography of British railway history.

The Society arranges events nationally in the form of meetings, both real and virtual, and trips and also has regional groups which organise meetings and trips to places of interest, and special interest groups organised nationally covering railway history, railway chronology, early railways, waterways history, roads and road transport, air transport, modern transport, and pipelines and materials handling; most operating primarily through the online circulation of material.

As of 2021, the society is developing the RCHS On-line Media Archive (ROMA) to make available online its archive of historic photographs and other material, of which the most notable is the Bertram Baxter collection of tramroad material.

The National Railway Museum has cited the society as one of the "bodies that shaped railway preservation and historical study," and it has been described as "the premier British society for scholarly transport research" by the bookseller Robert Humm in an interview for The Bookseller magazine.

== See also ==
- Canals of the United Kingdom
- History of the British canal system

== Bibliography ==
- Cook, R. A. (1979). "The Society – the first twenty-five years". Journal of the Railway and Canal Historical Society. 25: 43–50.
- Boyes, Grahame (1994). "The Society, 1979-94". Journal of the Railway and Canal Historical Society. 31: 296–305.
- Gwatkin, Geoff (2004). "The Society, 1995-2004". Journal of the Railway and Canal Historical Society. 34: 508–13, 695.
