= Old Roan railway station =

Railway station on the Ormskirk Branch of the Northern Line in Liverpool, England

Old Roan
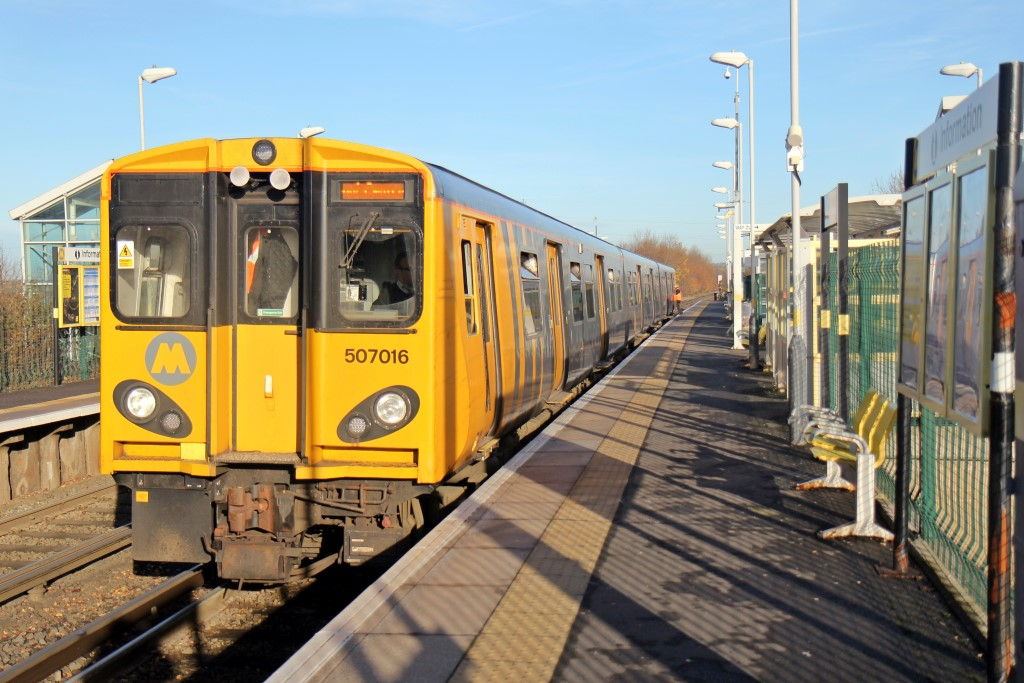
- Old Roan railway station, from the Liverpool platform

General information
- Location: Aintree, Sefton; England
- Coordinates: 53.4868°N 2.9508°W
- Grid reference: SJ370993
- Manager: Merseyrail
- Transit authority: Merseytravel
- Platforms: 2

Other information
- Station code: ORN
- Fare zone: C3
- Classification: DfT category E

History
- Original company: London, Midland and Scottish Railway
- Post-grouping: London, Midland and Scottish Railway

Key dates
- 17 February 1936: Station opened

Passengers
- 2021/22: ▲0.788 million
- 2022/23: ▲0.848 million
- 2023/24: ▲0.943 million
- 2024/25: ▲0.963 million
- 2025/26: ▼0.956 million
Location
Notes
- Passenger statistics from the Office of Rail and Road

Old Roan railway station is a railway station in Aintree village, Merseyside, England, about seven miles north-east of Liverpool, on the Ormskirk Branch of the Northern Line of the Merseyrail network.

== Location ==
The station is located on Ormskirk Road, with the southbound platform accessible from Ormskirk Road and the northbound platform under the railway bridge on Copy Lane (which is actually in Netherton). Interchange with local bus services is available on both Ormskirk Road, Copy Lane and from the station's new bus terminus. Old Roan is a more convenient station for much of Aintree Village compared with Aintree.

== History ==
The station was opened on 17 February 1936 by the London, Midland and Scottish Railway. The line was originally part of the Liverpool, Ormskirk and Preston Railway, until the railway was later absorbed by the Lancashire & Yorkshire Railway. Services ran from Ormskirk to Liverpool Exchange – the latter station closed in 1977 and now services run underground to Moorfields and continue on to Liverpool Central.

Housing development on what had previously been farmland encouraged the London Midland And Scottish Railway, successor to the Lancashire and Yorkshire, to build a station at Old Roan in 1935, it being named after an adjacent public house.

Although the lines on which Old Roan is situated ran parallel to those of the Cheshire Lines Committee's North Liverpool Extension Line, (running from Liverpool Central High Level to Southport Lord Street), there were no platforms on the CLC line, although a junction between the two routes did exist south of the station.

== Facilities ==
The station is staffed, 15 minutes before the first train and 15 minutes after the last train. There is a booking office, payphone, toilet and live departure and arrival screens for passenger information. The station has a secure storage for 20 cycles. The station is fully accessible for wheelchair users with lift access to the platforms and step free access to the car park and booking office.

== Services ==
Old Roan is served by electric trains between Liverpool Central and Ormskirk. There are trains every 15 minutes during Monday to Saturday daytime, and every 30 minutes during the evening and on Sundays.

== Gallery ==
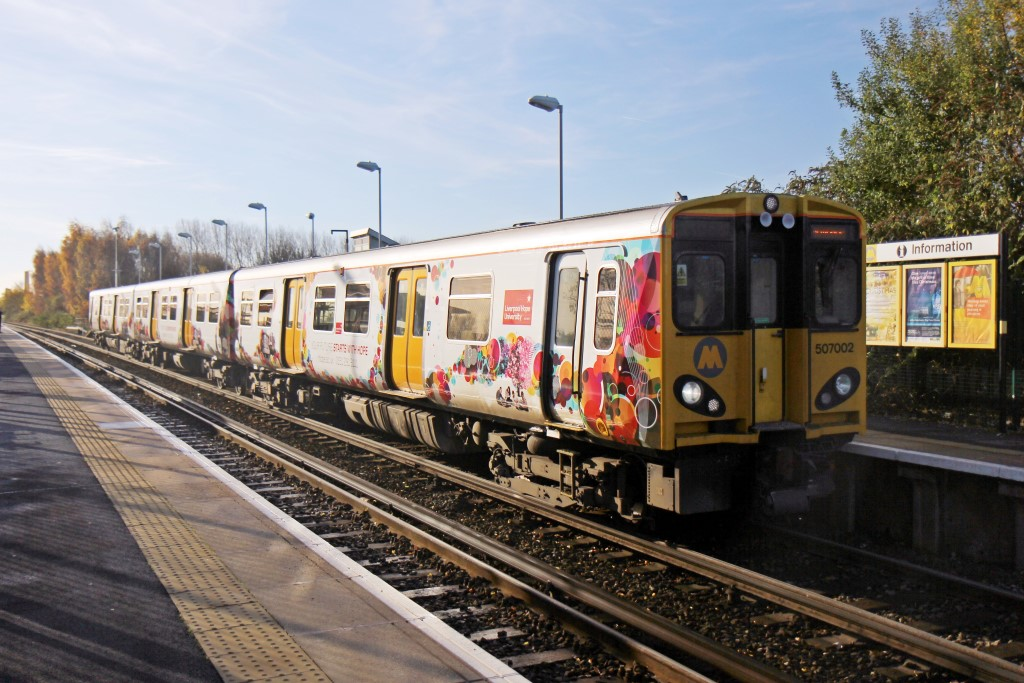
A Merseyrail Class 507 waits at the station.

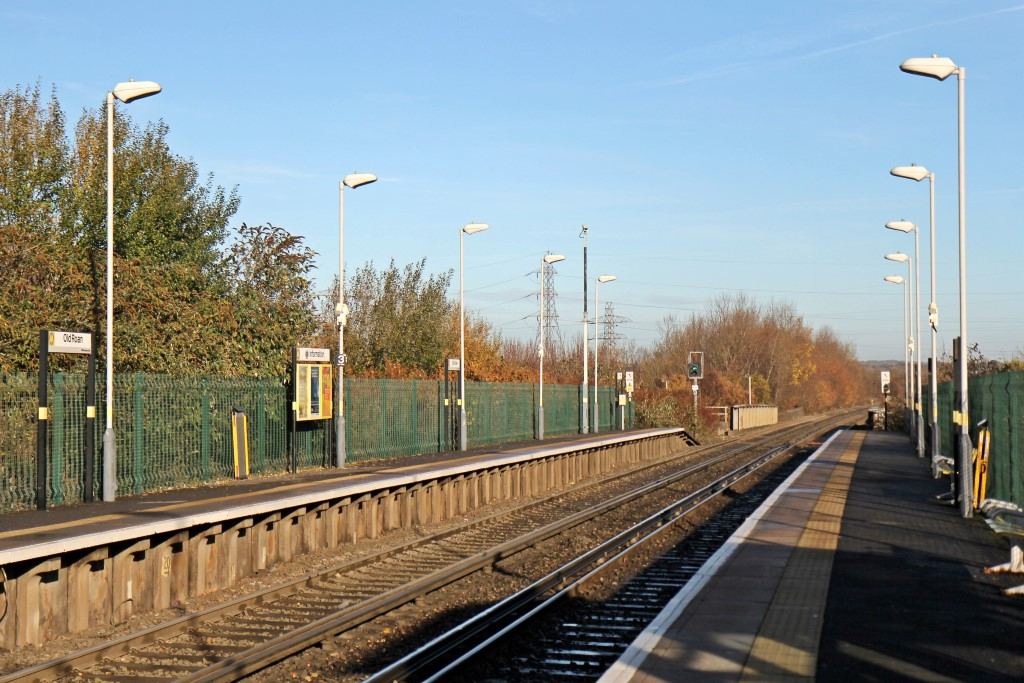
The station platforms.

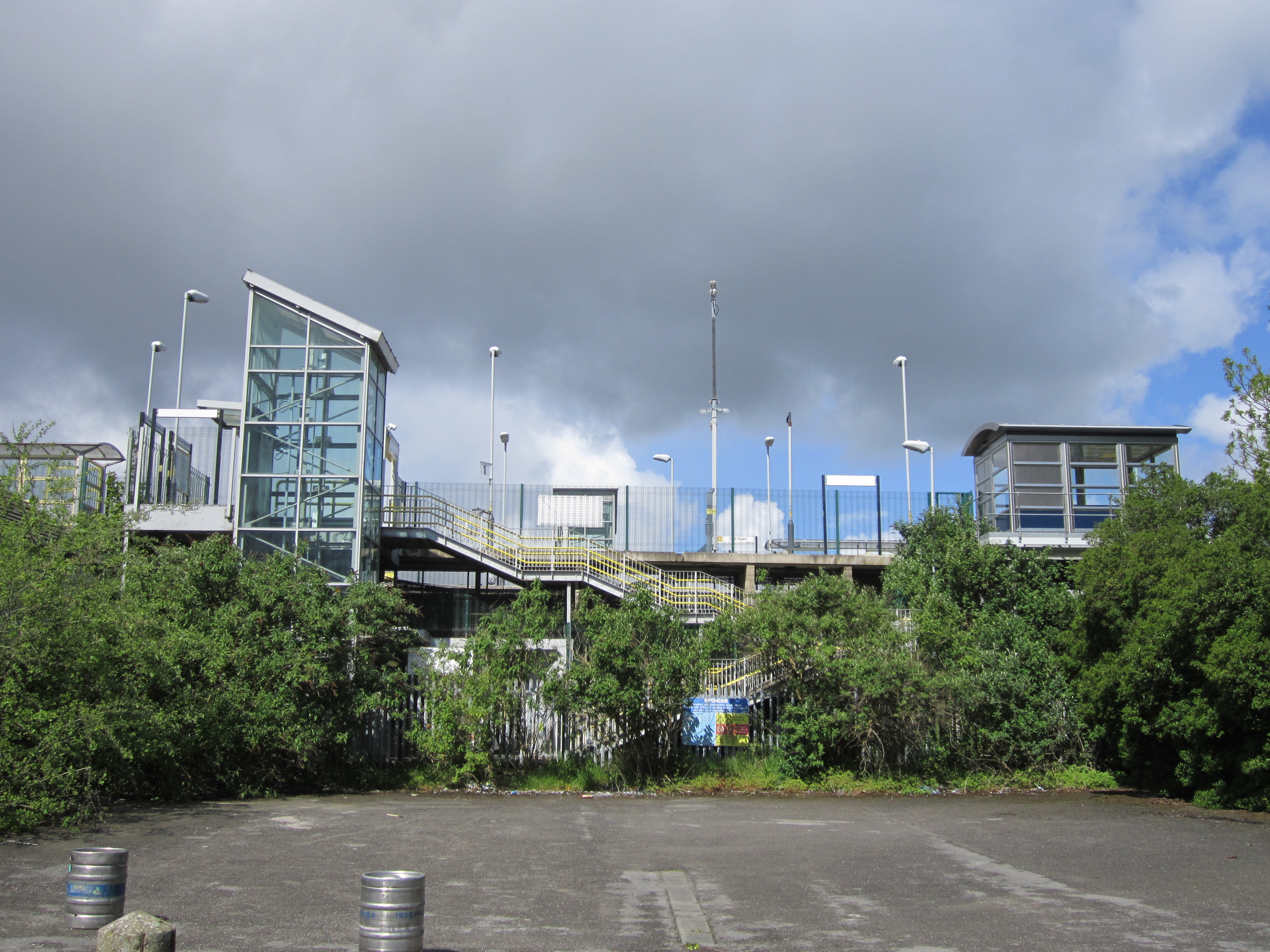
The station as viewed from the A59 Ormskirk Road.

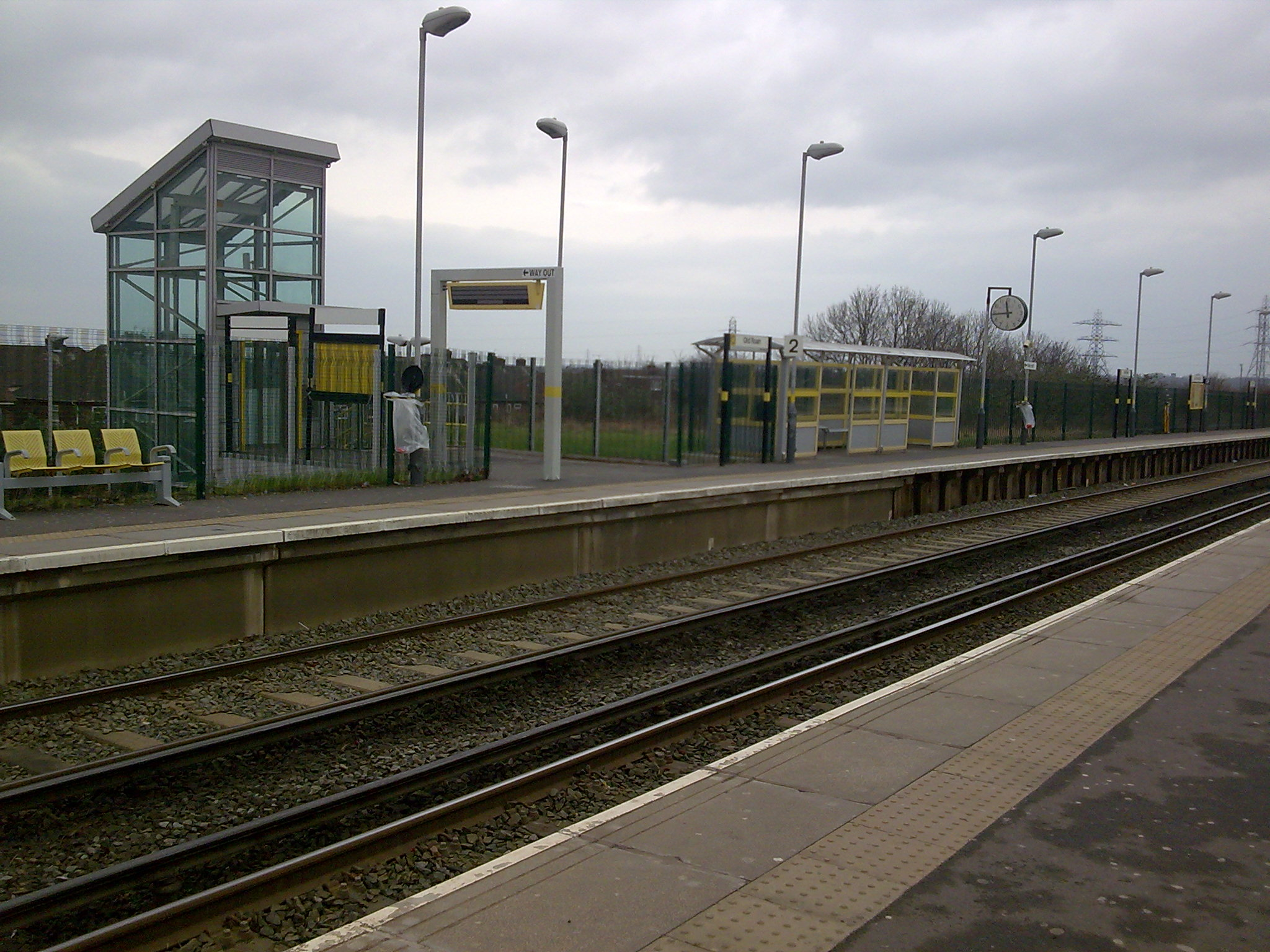
A view of the entrance from the platform.

Preceding station	National Rail	Following station
Maghull towards Ormskirk	Merseyrail; Northern Line	Aintree towards Liverpool Central
	Disused railways	
Aintree Central	Cheshire Lines Committee; SCLER	Sefton and Maghull
