= Ainsdale Beach railway station =

Former railway station in Merseyside, England

Ainsdale Beach
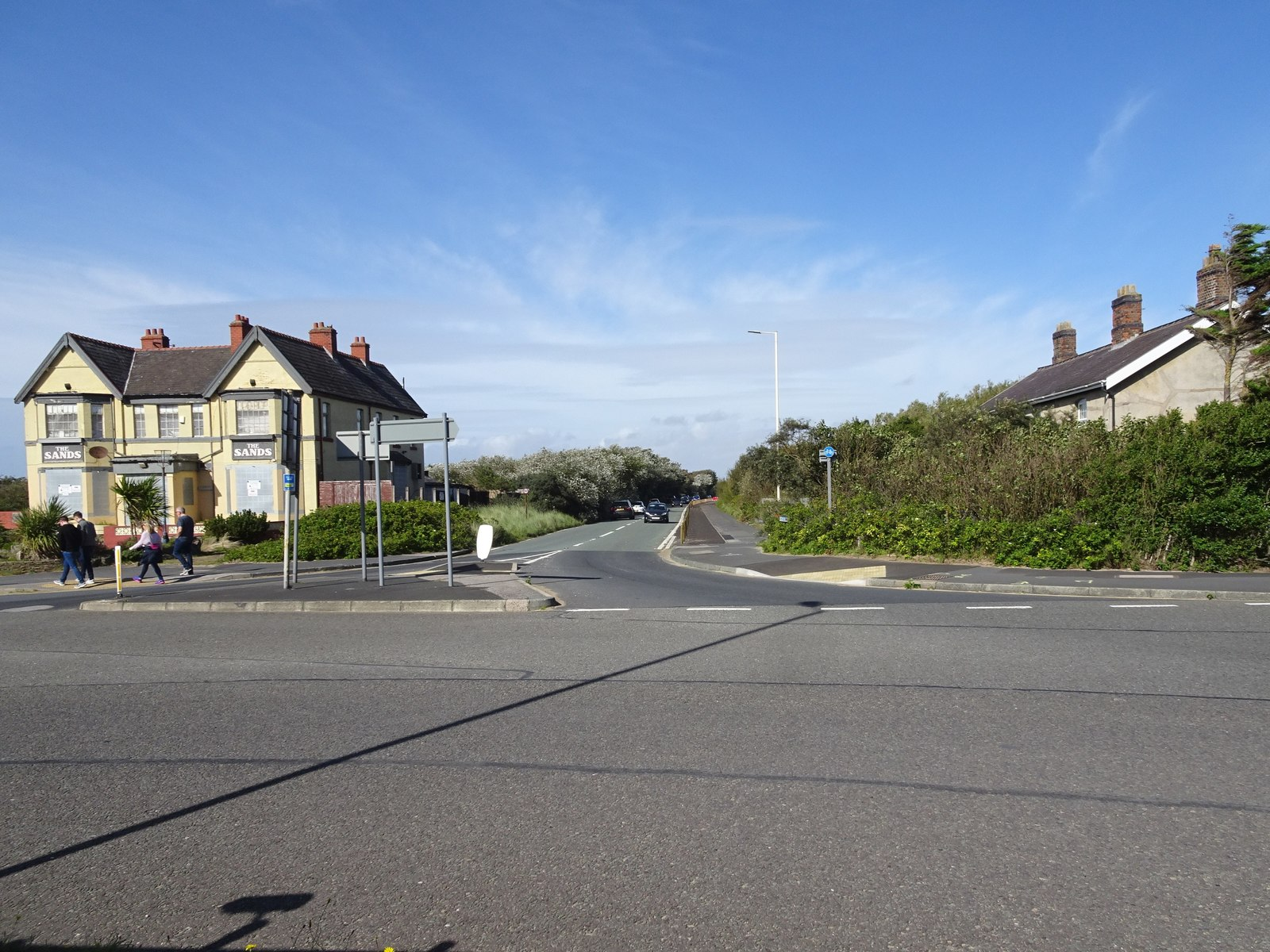
- Station site in 2020.

General information
- Location: Ainsdale, Sefton; England
- Coordinates: 53.6071°N 3.0568°W
- Grid reference: SD302128
- Line: Southport & Cheshire Lines Extension Railway
- Platforms: 2

Other information
- Status: Disused

History
- Original company: Cheshire Lines Committee
- Pre-grouping: Cheshire Lines Committee
- Post-grouping: Cheshire Lines Committee

Key dates
- 19 June 1901: Station opened as "Seaside"
- 1 January 1912: Station renamed "Ainsdale Beach"
- 1 January 1917: Station closed as a wartime economy measure
- 1 April 1919: Station reopened
- 7 January 1952: Station closed
Location

Ainsdale Beach was a railway station located in Ainsdale, Merseyside, England.

== History ==
The Southport & Cheshire Lines Extension Railway (SCLER) opened a line extending their existing system from Aintree to Southport on 1 September 1884. Seeing the potential in Ainsdale's large beach they subsequently built this station, which opened as Seaside in 1901. In 1911 it was decided to rename the station Ainsdale Beach, which took effect from 1 January 1912.

The station was built adjacent to a hotel called The Lakeside Hotel (in 2015 named 'The Sands' and trading as a local pub) situated at the coastal end of Shore Road. A terraced row of railway staff cottages immediately next to the station still stood in 2015, although all station structures, signal box and level crossing have long gone.

It was served by trains from Southport Lord Street, Liverpool Central and Manchester Central.

A total eclipse of the sun occurred in June 1927. The railway provided many excursion specials to many locations, including Ainsdale Beach.

== Run down and closure ==
The station first closed in 1917, along with all other stations on the extension line, as a First World War economy measure.

The station reopened on 1 April 1919, and continued in use until 7 January 1952, when the SCLER was closed to passengers from Aintree Central to Southport Lord Street. Public goods facilities were ended at Woodvale, Lydiate and Sefton & Maghull stations on the same day and there never were any goods facilities at Ainsdale Beach station. The line remained open for public goods traffic until 7 July 1952 at Southport Lord Street, Birkdale Palace and Altcar & Hillhouse stations. A siding remained open at Altcar & Hillhouse for private goods facilities until May 1960. The last passenger train to run on the SCLER was a railway enthusiasts' special train between Aintree and Altcar & Hillhouse stations on 6 June 1959.

The line came under the Cheshire Lines Committee until nationalisation in 1948, whereafter it came under the London Midland Region of British Railways until closure.

== The site today ==
Later the track bed through the station site was used to support what is now the Coastal Road, which runs from Woodvale to Southport. At this point the road is also part of the Trans Pennine Trail.

Preceding station	Disused railways	Following station
Woodvale; Line and station closed	Cheshire Lines Committee; SCLER	Birkdale Palace; Line and station closed
