= Southport Winter Gardens =

- Winter Gardens
- Winter Gardens

- Location within Southport town centre

General information
- Type: Entertainment complex
- Architectural style: Victorian Germano-Gothic
- Location: Lord Street, Southport
- Coordinates: 53.645522°N 3.013033°W
- Current tenants: Morrisons
- Construction started: 1870
- Completed: 16 September 1874
- Demolished: 1933 & 1962
- Owner: various owners (majority Morrisons)

Height
- Height: 80 ft (24 m)

Dimensions
- Other dimensions: 180 ft in length

Design and construction
- Architects: Maxwell & Tuke of Manchester

The Southport Winter Gardens was a Victorian entertainment area located within the town of Southport, Merseyside. The original winter gardens comprised a theatre, opera house, aquarium, a small zoo, conservatory, promenades and halls situated under the grand glass domes.

== History ==
The Winter Gardens were opened on 16 September 1874, on what was then the sea front at Southport. The building was in the form of two pavilions connected by a covered promenade, designed by Maxwell & Tuke of Manchester.

=== Layout ===
Southport Winter Gardens Artist drawing, c. 1874

The building had two Germano-Gothic pavilions, one of which held a concert hall known as the 'Pavilion', while the other was the iron and glass Winter Garden (known as the 'Conservatory'). The Pavilion had a capacity for 2,500 people and the Winter Garden was a total 180 ft in length with a maximum height of 80 ft. (In comparison, the central section of the Kew Palm House is just over 137 ft long and 63 ft high.) Southport Winter Garden was advertised as the largest conservatory in England and being the first seaside Winter Garden in the UK. Refreshment rooms and an aquarium filled the basement level.

=== Decline ===
Although it was one of the biggest buildings ever to grace an English sea front, the Winter Garden was not a great commercial success. The Southport Pavilion and Winter Gardens Company, which promoted it was locally based and had wide support in the town and throughout the north-west with 350 shareholders at its peak, but the addition of Frank Matcham's Opera House on an adjacent site in 1890–91 strained the capital base too far, and the Company went into liquidation in 1898. Many companies rapidly came and went in an effort to save the Winter Gardens in an attempt to turn a profit. Entertainments were lost or driven downmarket, until the Winter Garden was converted into a ballroom and roller skating rink, and the Pavilion became a cinema. Eventually both were demolished, with the Winter Garden in 1933 and the Pavilion in 1962.

== Opera House ==
The Opera House was built on Lord Street as an additional attraction to the main winter gardens complex. It opened on 7 September 1891 and was supported by leading dramatic companies in the area. It was designed by Frank Matcham, architect of many theatres in the United Kingdom. The building seated 2,000 people and cost around £20,000 to build. At the time the Opera House theatre was considered nationally to be one of Matcham's finest creations. The venue was a great success and had many well known performers attend including Ellen Terry, Matheson Lang, Sir Henry Irving. In December 1929 a fire raged through the building completely destroying it.

== Garrick Theatre ==
After the Opera House burned down in December 1929, the site was cleared and architect George E. Tonge prepared plans for a new theatre which opened on 19 December 1932. It was, and remains, a glorious exercise in Art Deco style, inside and out.

Garrick Theatre initially operated as a live venue only. The theatre was well provided with front of house space and had a spacious auditorium on two levels (plus boxes) seating 1,600 (later reduced to 1,500). The original colour scheme was yellow and gold with green and black highlights, all lighting was indirect via troughs except for a chandelier in the centre of the balcony recess. There are four boxes on either side of the stage. The theatre was advertised as the most beautiful in Europe upon opening.

The stage was particularly large, and was designed to accommodate touring drama, musicals opera and ballet and a pantomime was produced at Christmas. The proscenium arch is 50 feet wide. There was an open colonnade terrace containing an ornamental garden on the top of the Lord Street elevation, which was used in summer months.

The theatre hosted musicals, comedies and dramatic plays. Tommy Handley, George Formby, Gordon Harker, Robertson Hare are to name a few of the well known artists to have performed at the theatre. Live shows ended on 19 January 1957 with the pantomime "Robin Hood on Ice".

The Garrick Theatre was sold to the Newcastle upon Tyne based Essoldo Cinemas chain in January 1957 and the follow-spot box was converted into a projection booth. It opened as a cinema on 21 January 1957.

There were occasional stage shows, but these were not a success and from May 1962 it screened films only. During 1963 bingo was introduced on Sundays and Fridays.

It was converted into a Lucky 7 Bingo Club (from 1984 a Top Rank Bingo Club and finally Mecca Bingo). It was closed in March 2020 due to the COVID-19 pandemic.

On 29 July 1999, the former Garrick Theatre was designated a Grade II Listed building by English Heritage. In February 2022 it was added to the Theatres Trust list of "Theatres at Risk".

== The Ribble Building ==
=== Railway Station ===
The Ribble Building is a former Victorian building that was built on the site of the Winter Gardens to house the Southport Lord Street railway station The Station opened on 1 September 1884 as the Southport & Cheshire Lines Extension Railway's (SCLER) northern terminus, which provided an alternative route to Liverpool City Centre from Southport, which ran coastally through the Sand Dunes. The last trains left the station on Saturday, 5 January 1952.

=== Bus Station ===
After the closure of the railway station Southport Lord Street Station was taken over by Ribble Buses. The spaces in between the platforms were filled in, but the rest of the interior remained the same. The train shed remained in use by the bus company until Ribble Buses ceased to operate from the building in the early 1990s. The train shed was later demolished but the frontage on Lord Street was retained and still exists today. In 2014 it was internally converted and opened as a Travelodge Hotel.

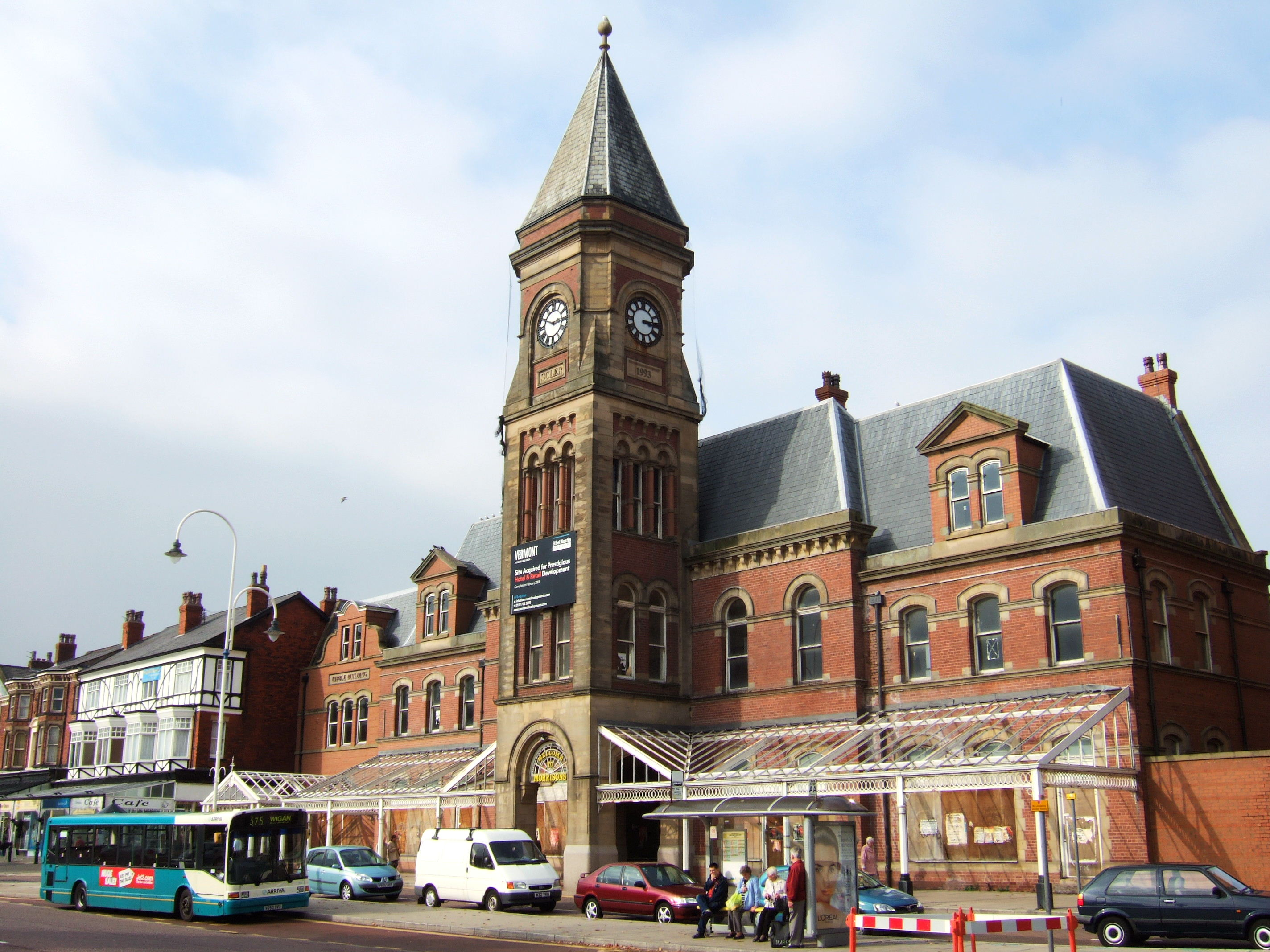
The Ribble Building in 2007

== Model Village ==
The first model village in Southport was once situated on the Winter Gardens site and was known as the Land of the Little People. The Model village was demolished in the late 1980s to make way for the aborted Winter Gardens/SIBEC shopping development. The site is now occupied by Morrisons car park and petrol garage.

== Winter Gardens Shopping Development ==
In 1991 the £40million plan known as the Winter Gardens Project crumbled as the construction company responsible for the projects went into receivership, a new developer was sought to continue the construction work on the already half built department store planned for the site. The work was finally completed for the new Safeway supermarket, which opened in the early 1990s, but the Winter Gardens Style shopping centre was never fully completed to the plans. Safeway later extended the car parking facilities and added a petrol garage to their facilities on site. The Safeway supermarket was taken over by Morrisons in 2004. A mural in memory of the Winter Gardens can be seen as you look up upon entering the main entrance to the Morrisons Store on the site today.
