= Woodvale railway station =

Former railway station in Merseyside, UK

Woodvale

General information
- Location: Woodvale, Sefton; England
- Coordinates: 53.5882°N 3.0409°W
- Grid reference: SD311107
- Platforms: 2

Other information
- Status: Disused

History
- Original company: Southport & Cheshire Lines Extension Railway
- Pre-grouping: Cheshire Lines Committee
- Post-grouping: Cheshire Lines Committee

Key dates
- 1 September 1884: Station opened as "Woodville & Ainsdale"
- 1 May 1898: Station renamed "Woodvale"
- 1 January 1917: Station closed
- 1 April 1919: Station reopened
- 7 January 1952: Station closed completely
Location

Woodvale railway station was a railway station located in Woodvale, Merseyside, England.

== History ==
The Southport & Cheshire Lines Extension Railway (SCLER) opened the station on 1 September 1884 as Woodville & Ainsdale, though one source refers to it as "Woodvale and Ainsdale". It was renamed Woodvale on 1 May 1898. The station was built on an embankment crossing Liverpool Road and was well known for its floral displays on both platforms.

=== Run down and closure ===
The station first closed in 1917, along with all other stations on the extension line, as part of a World War I cost-cutting effort.

The station was reopened on 1 April 1919, and continued in use until 7 January 1952, when the SCLER was closed to passengers from Aintree Central to Southport Lord Street. The line remained open for public goods traffic until 7 July 1952 at Southport Lord St., Birkdale Palace and Altcar & Hillhouse Stations. Public goods services were ended at Woodvale, Lydiate and Sefton & Maghull stations—there were never any goods facilities at the Ainsdale Beach station—on Saturday, 5 January 1952, which was the same date as passenger services were ended. The official railway closing date is always given as the Monday following the date of the last trains' run, meaning that the official closing date is 7 January 1952. However, train services almost always end on a Saturday. The final ticket stubs show the date as being 5 January 1952. A private siding remained open at Altcar & Hillhouse after 7 July 1952, finally closing in May 1960. The last passenger train to run on the SCLER was a railway enthusiasts' special between the Aintree and Altcar & Hillhouse railways stations on 6 June 1959.

== Present ==
The track bed was later utilised to support what is now the Coastal Road, which runs from Woodvale to Southport.

Preceding station	Disused railways	Following station
Mossbridge; Line and station closed	Cheshire Lines Committee; SCLER	Ainsdale Beach; Line and station closed
