= St Catherine's Chapel, Lydiate =

Chapel in Merseyside, England

Coordinates: 53.5368°N 2.9613°W

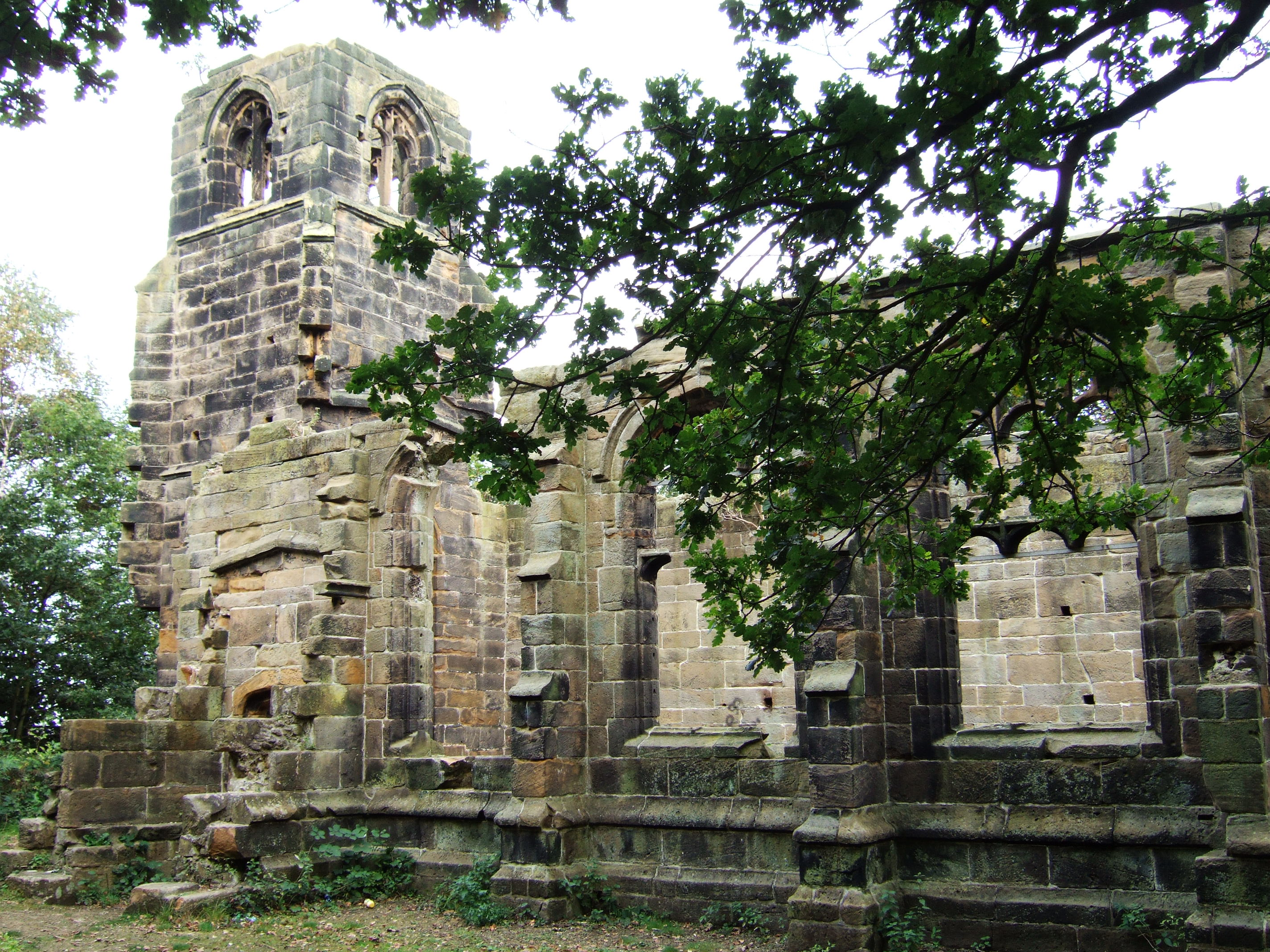
Ruins of St Catherine's Chapel

St Catherine's Chapel, known locally as Lydiate Abbey, is a ruined chapel located in Lydiate, Merseyside, England. The Chapel is situated on the A5147, adjacent to the Scotch Piper Inn. It is a Grade II* listed building, and a Scheduled Monument.

Although the precise years of construction are unknown, it is likely that the chapel was built in the late 15th or early 16th century by the Ireland family. It was primarily used for private worship, and stopped being used during the 16th century dissolution of the monasteries. Since then, it—along with the nearby Lydiate Hall—have gradually fallen into ruin, with only the outer structure remaining. The chapel grounds are now used to host local community events.

== History ==
The chapel was built some time in the late 15th or early 16th century, primarily for the private worship of the Ireland family, who held the Lydiate lordship at the time. The parish church was located in Halsall, over 3 miles (5 km) away from Lydiate Hall, making a local chapel considerably more convenient. The chapel was also used by some local residents, though it was never consecrated.

Although no definitive records are available, it is believed that construction of the chapel was initiated by Laurence Ireland, who named it in honour of his wife, Catherine Blundell. Catherine's initials ("C. I.", following her marriage), along with those of Laurence, were engraved on the church. Although Laurence may have started the chapel's construction, it is possible that it was only finished by his son, John Ireland, following Laurence's death.

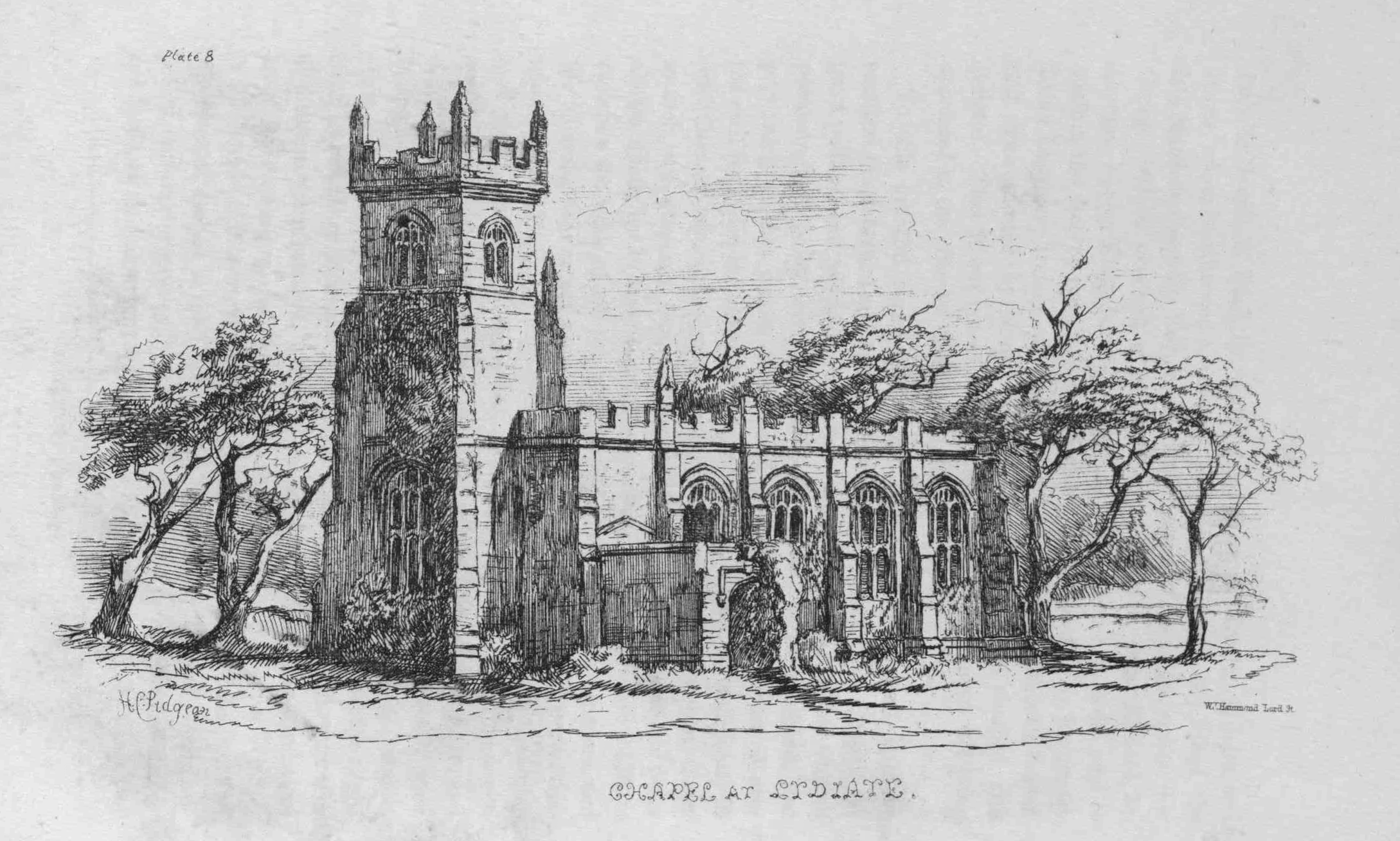
Sketch of Lydiate Abbey made in 1848

Its use as a private chapel probably ceased following Henry VIII's dissolution of the monasteries in the mid 16th century. There is evidence that parts of the building, including the entrance doors and window supports, were removed forcibly. Four damaged alabaster tablets, depicting the life of Saint Catherine, reside in Our Lady's Catholic Church in Lydiate, and are believed to have composed part of the reredos or altar of St Catherine's Chapel, though there is no definitive proof of this. These tablets date to 1420 - 1460, which would help date the chapel's construction. Some 18th and 19th century historians believed that the chapel was never finished, however this has since been refuted by evidence of completed interior features, including a clearly delineated sanctuary.

During Thomas Pennant's travels in 1773, at which time the chapel was owned by Henry Blundell, Pennant described the building as "most beautiful", with intact pinnacles and battlements, but overgrown with ivy. At this time the roof was no longer present. In an 1848 overview of the building, William John Roberts noted that the chapel's walls were all standing, except that by this time some of the battlements had deteriorated. By the end of the 19th century, the porch over the southern entrance had collapsed.

A small cemetery exists on the grounds, which continued to receive burials even after the chapel itself had stopped being used, primarily for Jesuit priests, who were interred secretly. The earliest grave dates from 1701, and the cemetery was still in use for some Catholic burials as late as the latter half of the 19th century.

Despite its local name, the building has never been used as an abbey, with the name 'Lydiate Abbey' being a local tradition which became popular.

=== Modern history ===
During the 1950s and 1960s, a local priest maintained the chapel site, protecting it from vandalism, while attempting to raise money to restore the building to functional use.

The chapel, along with its burial grounds, was listed as a Scheduled monument in 1949, and designated as a Grade II* listed building in October 1968.

In the 21st century, the chapel grounds have been used to host community events, including annual performances of Shakespeare.

== Architecture ==
The chapel is built of sandstone in a perpendicular style, with buttresses and battlements on the north and south walls. The building had no windows on the northern wall—the reason is unknown—though it did have exterior doors on both north and south walls, with the southern door covered by a porch. The square tower had three stories. The east window was stained glass, but the colour had been lost from glass remains found nearby, so the pattern or image is unknown.

== Gallery ==
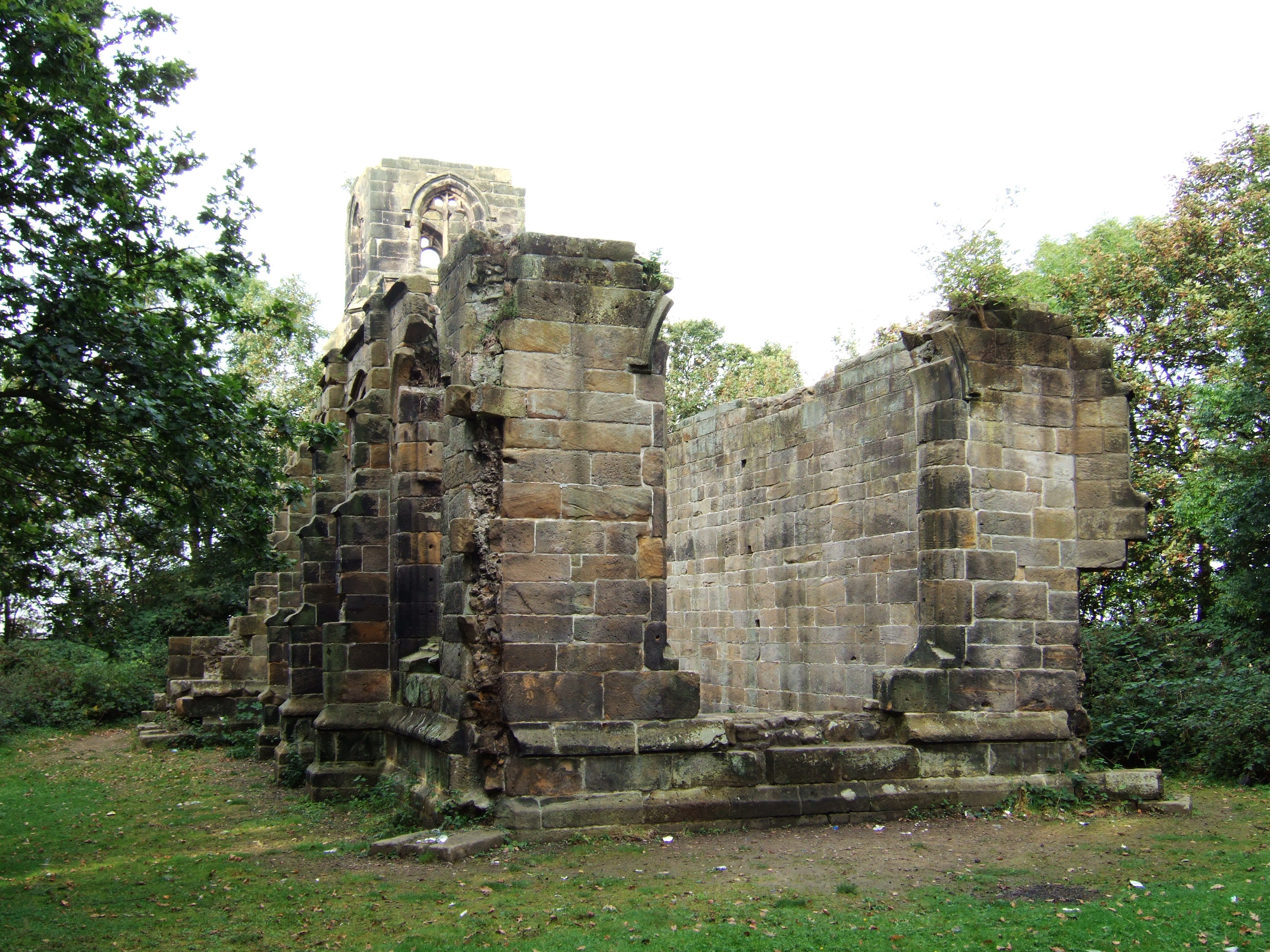
The east end of the Chapel.

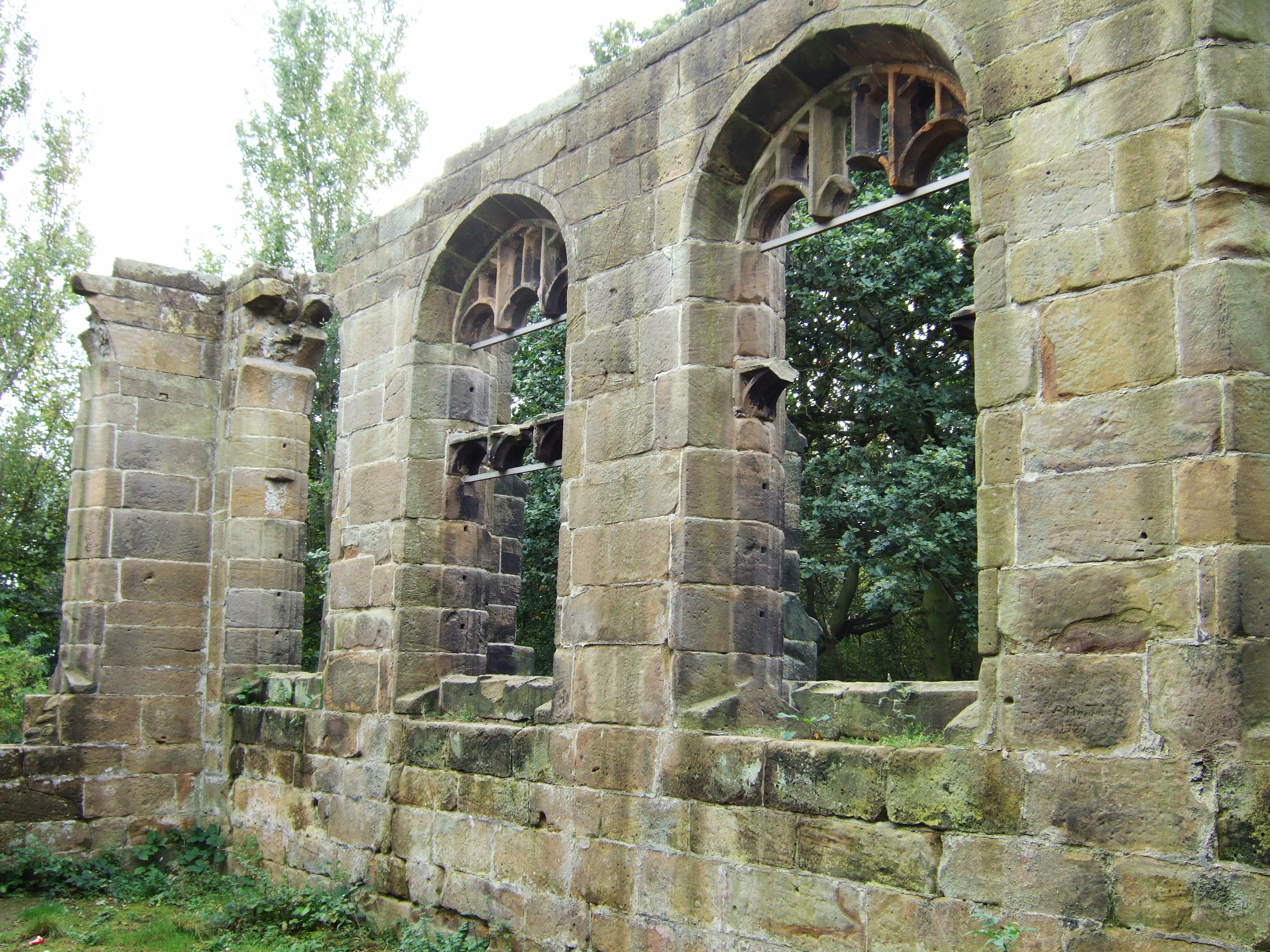
South wall windows.

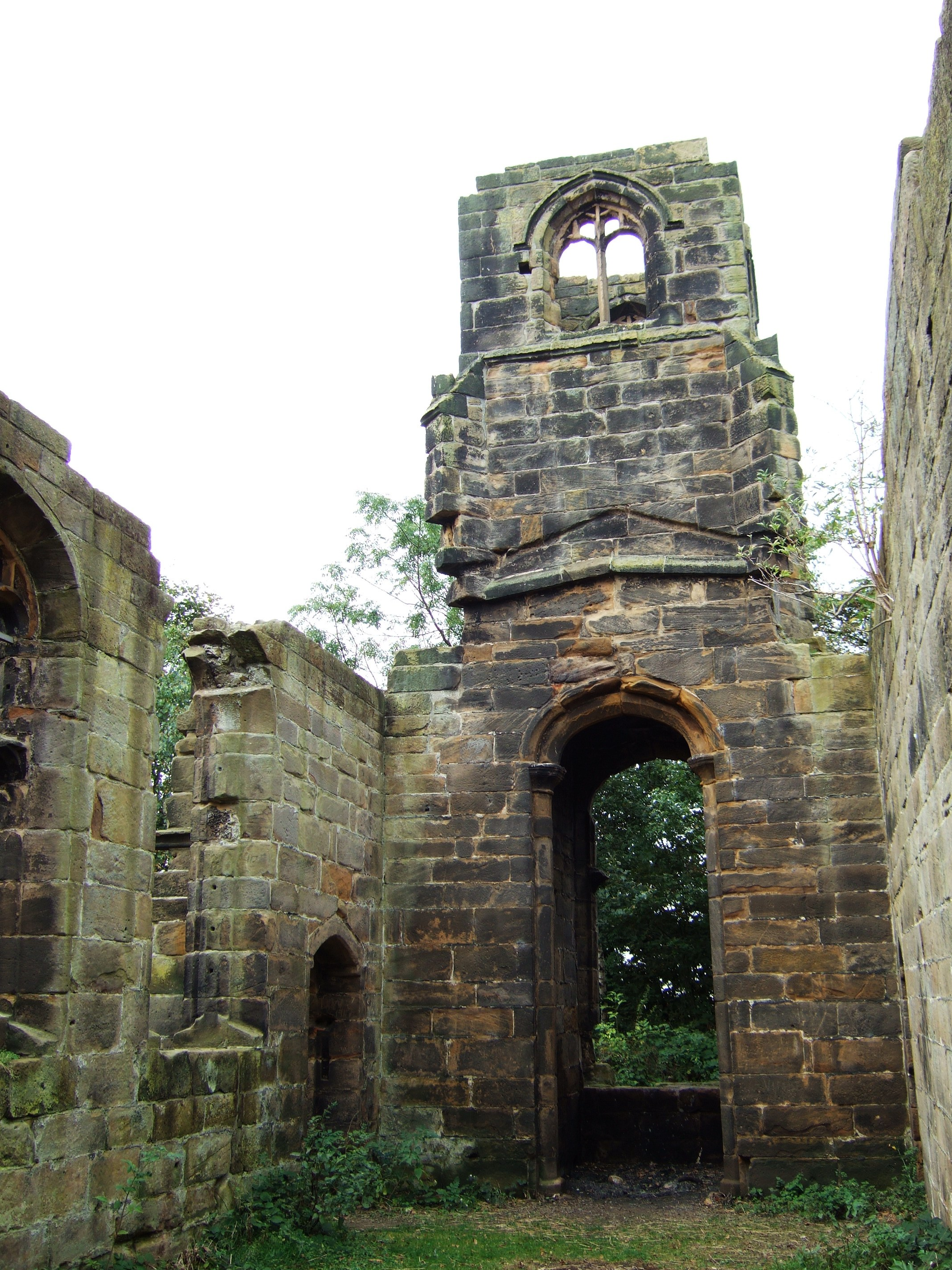
Interior view of the tower.

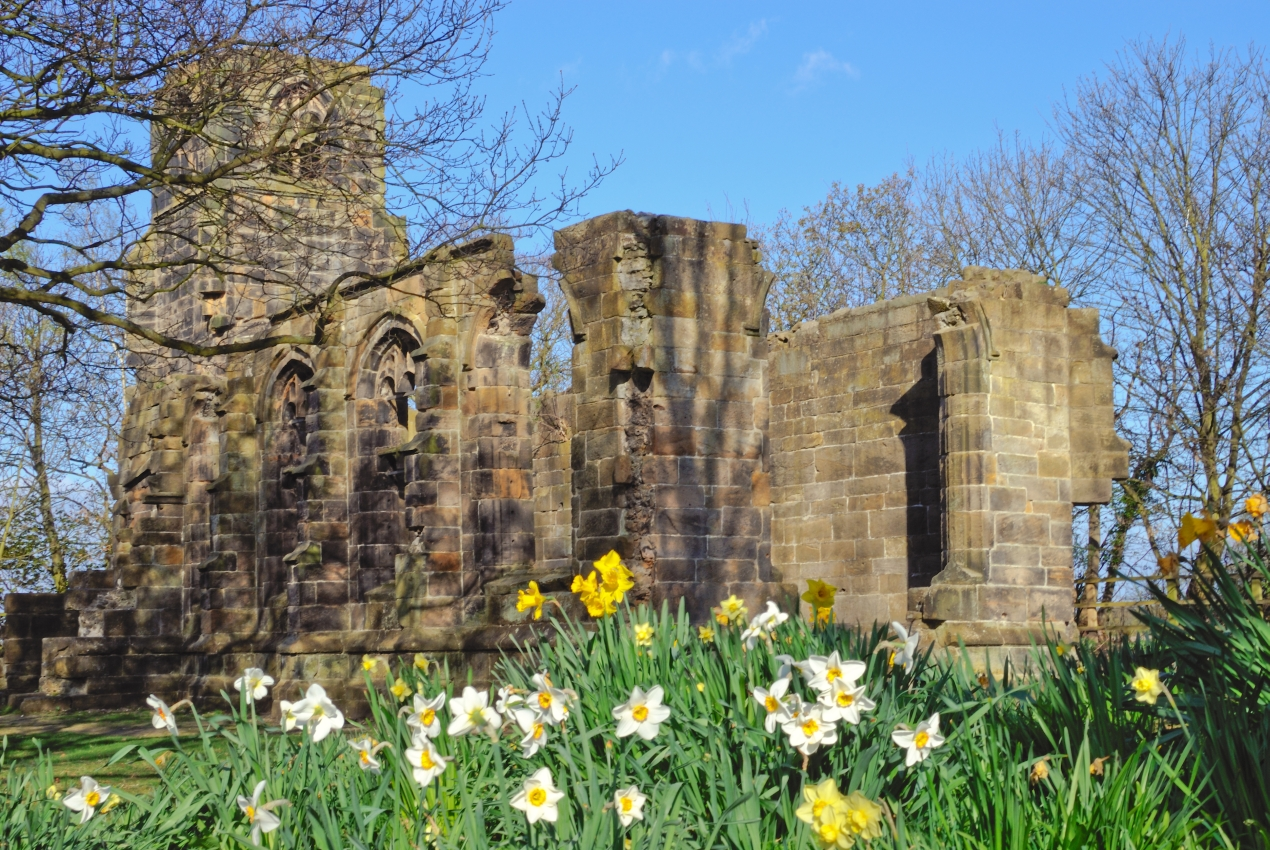

== See also ==
- Listed buildings in Lydiate
- Lydiate Hall
