= Lordship of Lydiate =

Coordinates: 53.536°N 2.959°W

The manor of Lydiate is situated about 10 miles (16 km) from Liverpool on the Southport Road.

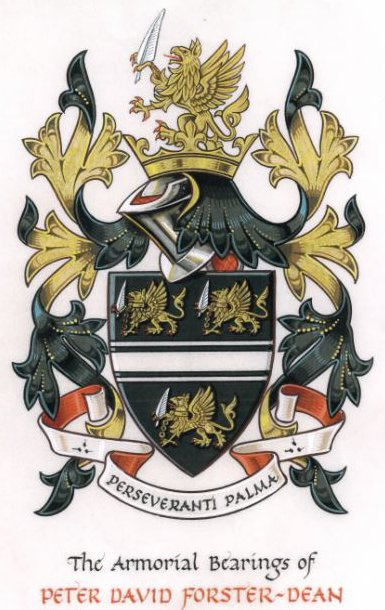
The armorial bearings of Peter Forster-Dean

From the Domesday Book it appears that:

Uctred held Lydiate. There are six bovates of land, and a wood one league long and two furlongs broad. It was worth sixty-four pence.

The ancient reading of Lydiate points to its etymology “lea”, a field or pasture and “ate”, a gate. We find it written “Lydyate” in very early deeds. Lydiate is one of the best-documented manors in England. Following the Norman Conquest Uctred was dispossessed and the Conqueror granted Lydiate to Roger of Poictou, a great Normal earl who accordingly gave the Manor to Paganus de Vilars to hold it under him on the service of a knight's fee. The dependents of Paganus de Vilars took the surname of “de Lydiate”.

In the early 15th century the Lordship passed by marriage into the de Ireland family and remained with the family until the death of Laurence Ireland in 1673 when he was succeeded by his son-in-law Charles Anderton. The Blundell family of Ince-Blundell inherited the title Lord of Lydiate through the marriage of Mary Anderton to Henry Blundel in the early 18th century. The title passed from Weld-Blundell to Downing and then the Forster-Dean family. The current Lord of Lydiate is Peter Forster-Dean who is thirty-second in descent from Roger of Poictou.

== See also ==
- Lydiate Hall
