= St Thomas' Church, Lydiate =

Church in Merseyside, England

Coordinates: 53.5443°N 2.9624°W

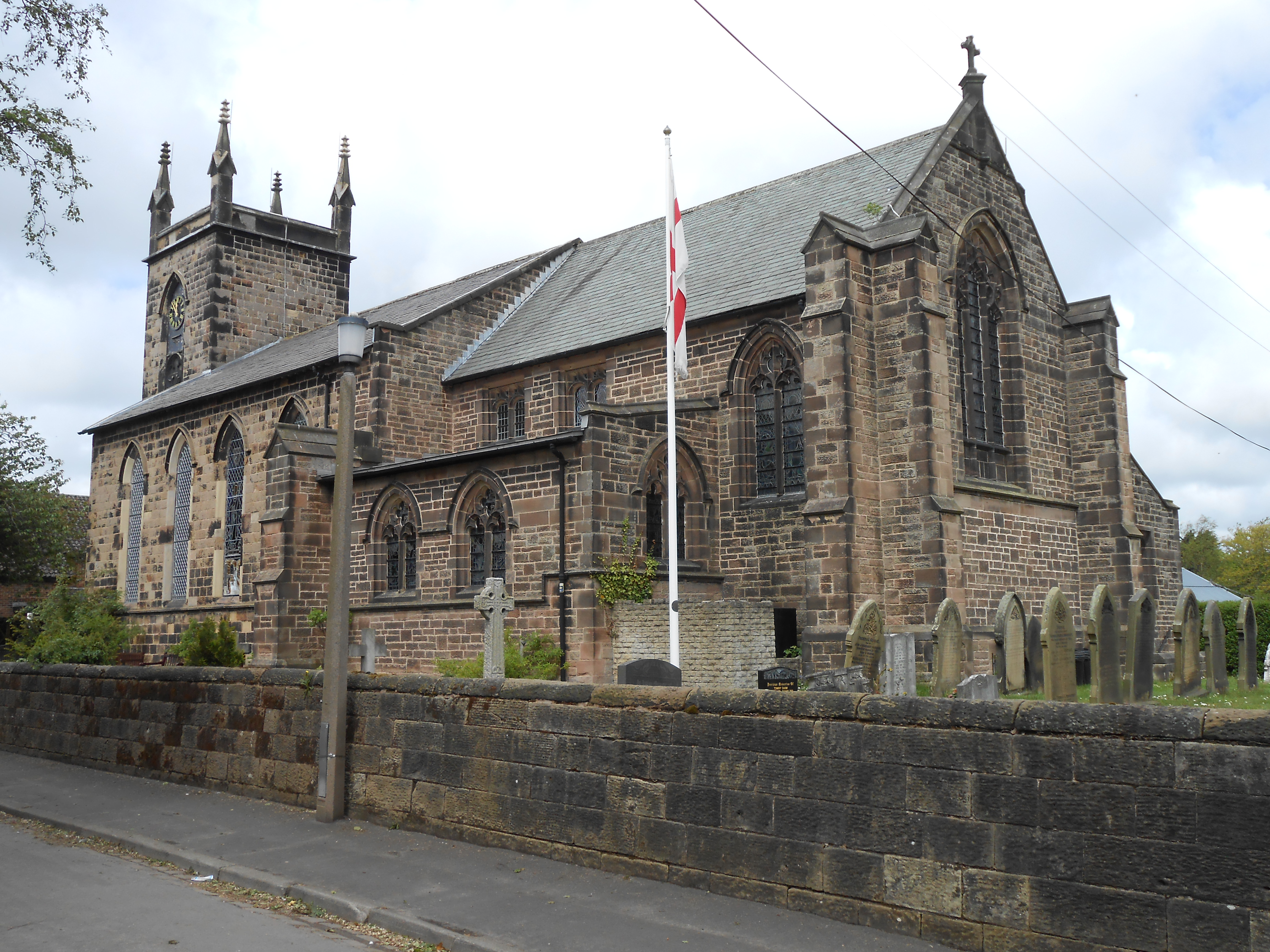
- St Thomas' Church, Lydiate, from the southeast

- Location in Merseyside
- OS grid reference: SD 363 057
- Location: Church Lane, Lydiate, Sefton, Merseyside
- Country: England
- Denomination: Anglican
- Website: St Thomas, Lydiate

History
- Status: Parish church

Architecture
- Functional status: Active
- Heritage designation: Grade II
- Designated: 11 October 1968
- Architect(s): A. H. Holme (?); Austin and Paley
- Architectural type: Church
- Style: Gothic Revival
- Groundbreaking: 1839
- Completed: 1912

Specifications
- Materials: Stone, slate roofs

Administration
- Province: York
- Diocese: Liverpool
- Archdeaconry: Warrington
- Deanery: Ormskirk
- Parish: Lydiate and Downholland, St Thomas

St Thomas' Church is in Church Lane, Lydiate, Sefton, Merseyside, England. It is an active Anglican parish church in the deanery of Ormskirk, the archdeaconry of Wigan and West Lancashire, and the diocese of Liverpool. Its benefice has been combined with that of St Cuthbert, Halsall. The church is recorded in the National Heritage List for England as a designated Grade II listed building.

== History ==
The church was built between 1839 and 1841, and designed probably by A. H. Holme (the builders being S. Holme and Son). At this time it was a chapel of ease to St Cuthbert, Halsall, and it became a separate parish in its own right in 1871. Additions were made to the church in 1912, including the chancel, a south chapel and a north vestry, by the Lancaster architects Austin and Paley. These additions cost £6,000 (equivalent to £250,000 in 2025).

== Architecture ==
St Thomas' is constructed in stone with a slate roof. Its plan consists of a four-bay nave, a chancel with a south chapel and a north vestry, and a west tower. The tower has pointed doorways on the west and south sides, a north lancet window, a clock face on the south side, and a plain parapet with corner pinnacles. The windows in the nave are lancets. The east window has three lights with Perpendicular tracery. There are two-light windows elsewhere in the chancel and chapel, and three-light windows in the vestry. Inside the church is a west gallery carried on two octagonal iron columns. The nave has a flat ceiling and the chancel a waggon roof. In the chancel is a recess for a sedilia, and an alabaster reredos. In the south window of the chancel is stained glass from 1913.

== See also ==
- Listed buildings in Lydiate
- List of ecclesiastical works by Austin and Paley (1895–1914)
