= Listed buildings in Lydiate =

Lydiate is a civil parish and a village in Sefton, Merseyside, England. It contains 14 buildings that are recorded in the National Heritage List for England as designated listed buildings. Of these, two are listed at Grade II*, the middle of the three grades, and the others are at Grade II, the lowest grade.

The parish is partly residential, containing the village of Lydiate and its later expansion to become effectively a suburb of Maghull, and is otherwise rural. The Leeds and Liverpool Canal passes through the parish. The listed buildings include houses and farmhouses with associated structures, churches, a public house, two bridges crossing the canal, a ruined country house, a ruined chapel, and a medieval cross.

== Key ==
Grade	Criteria
II*	Particularly important buildings of more than special interest
II	Buildings of national importance and special interest

== Buildings ==
Name and location	Photograph	Date	Notes	Grade
Cross; 53.53979°N 2.96023°W	—	Medieval	The upper part of the cross is and the lower parts date from the 19th century. It is in stone and consists of a moulded plinth on three hexagonal steps and a chamfered cross. The cross was found in a field in the 1870s, and was restored and placed in the churchyard of Our Lady's.	II
Lydiate Hall; 53.53884°N 2.96319°W		15th century	Once a country house in a courtyard plan, with three sides timber-framed and one side in stone, only ruins remain. These are in brick and stone, with part of a slate roof. The remains include the foundations, standing walls with mullioned windows, chimney stacks, and a Tudor-headed fireplace.	II
Scotch Piper Inn; 53.53643°N 2.96004°W		16th century (Note: The date of 1320 has been claimed for its origin. Pollard and Pevsner state that it is not that old, and the cruck frames date from the mid to late 16th century.)	A brick public house, whitewashed, with a thatched roof. It is in three bays. The left two bays are in a single storey, and contain at least two cruck trusses; it was encased in brick in the 17th century. The right bay was rebuilt in the 18th century, using fabric from Lydiate Hall, and is in 1 1/2 storeys. On the front are four buttresses, and the windows are horizontally-sliding sashes, with a gabled dormer.	II*
St Catherine's Chapel; 53.53681°N 2.96125°W		Late 15th or early 16th century	A ruined stone chapel, also known as Lydiate Abbey, it is roofless. There are remaining parts of a nave, a south porch, and a west tower. In the south wall are Perpendicular windows with some surviving tracery, and buttresses. The tower is in three stages. The chapel and adjoining burial ground are a scheduled monument.	II*
Barn, Lydiate House; 53.52761°N 2.95844°W	—	1611	A barn and stable in stone with repairs in brick, and a slate roof. The barn is in three bays, and has large quoins, ventilation slots and a large entrance. In the stable are three entrance with large lintels, one inscribed, and blocked windows, pitch hole, and loading bay.	II
Church House; 53.54469°N 2.96180°W	—	17th century	A house, altered later, in brick on a stone base with a slate roof. It has two storeys, a two-bay front, and a rear wing. On the front is an entrance, a three-light mullioned window in the ground floor, a stair window, and a two-light horizontally-sliding sash window in the upper storey.	II
Church View Cottages; 53.54435°N 2.96151°W	—	17th century	A pair of cruck-framed cottages in roughcast brick, with a stone base and quoins, and a slate roof. They are in a single storey with an attic, and have three bays. The windows have segmental heads, some with casements, and others with horizontally-sliding sashes. Inside are two cruck trusses with wattle and daub infill.	II
Carriage house, Lydiate House; 53.52793°N 2.95852°W	—	Early 18th century (probable)	The carriage house is in stone with a stone=slate roof. There is an entrance in the west gable end with a large lintel, and a former entrance on the north face with an inserted window.	II
Meadow View Farmhouse; 53.53092°N 2.96338°W	—	1741	The farmhouse has been divided into two dwellings. It is in brick with stone dressings and a slate roof. The house has two storeys and a three-bay front, with quoins on the corners. At the entrance is a gabled porch with a date stone above. The ground floor windows are casements, and those in the upper floor are horizontally-sliding sashes.	II
Rose Hill; 53.53341°N 2.94240°W	—	18th century	The façade dates from the mid 19th century. The house is in brick, partly pebbledashed and partly stuccoed, with stone dressings and a slate roof. It has two storeys, and is in seven bays. The first two bays are recessed, and the other five bays are symmetrical. There is a round-headed porch with pilasters, a frieze and a cornice flanked by single-storey canted bay windows. The windows are sashes with architraves.	II
Lydiate Hill Bridge; 53.53540°N 2.95304°W		c. 1770	An accommodation bridge over the Leeds and Liverpool Canal. It is in stone and consists of a single elliptical arch with a parapet.	II
Lydiate Bridge; 53.52920°N 2.95768°W		c. 1770	Bridge No. 17, carrying Pilling Lane over the Leeds and Liverpool Canal. It is in stone and consists of a single elliptical arch with a parapet. At the end are pilaster strips.	II
St Thomas' Church; 53.54427°N 2.96240°W		1839–41	This originated as a simple church consisting of a nave with lancet windows, and a small tower, probably by A.H. Holme. The chancel, north vestry, and south chapel were added in 1912 by Austin and Paley. The tower has doorways, a clock face, and a plain parapet with corner pinnacles.	II
Our Lady's Church; 53.53960°N 2.96002°W		1854–55	A Roman Catholic church by J. J. Scoles in stone with a slate roof. It consists of a nave, aisles, a south porch and vestry, and a northwest tower. Inside the church are a reredos of 1878 by Edmund Kirby, and medieval alabaster reliefs moved here from St Catherine's Chapel.	II

== Notes and references ==
Notes

Citations

Sources

- Historic England, "Cross approx. 10 m. north of church of Our Lady, Lydiate (1075838)", National Heritage List for England
- Historic England, "Remains of Lydiate Hall (1075840)", National Heritage List for England
- Historic England, "The Scotch Piper public house, Lydiate (1343315)", National Heritage List for England
- Historic England, "St. Katherine's Chapel (Lydiate Abbey) (1199469)", National Heritage List for England
- Historic England, "Domestic chapel of St Katharine of Alexandria and burial ground, Lydiate (1017499)", National Heritage List for England
- Historic England, "Barn to Lydiate House (1075835)", National Heritage List for England
- Historic England, "Church House, Lydiate (1343314)", National Heritage List for England
- Historic England, "Church View Cottages, Lydiate (1075837)", National Heritage List for England
- Historic England, "Carriage house at Lydiate House (1075877)", National Heritage List for England
- Historic England, "Meadow View Farmhouse, Lydiate (1075836)", National Heritage List for England
- Historic England, "Rose Hill, Lydiate (1343312)", National Heritage List for England
- Historic England, "Lydiate Hill bridge approx. 40 m. from road (1075839)", National Heritage List for England
- Historic England, "Lydiate Bridge (1199419)", National Heritage List for England
- Historic England, "St. Thomas Church, Lydiate (1343291)", National Heritage List for England
- Historic England, "Church of Our Lady, Lydiate (1343313)", National Heritage List for England
- Historic England, Listed Buildings
- Pollard, Richard; Pevsner, Nikolaus (2006), Lancashire: Liverpool and the South-West, The Buildings of England, New Haven and London: Yale University Press, ISBN 0-300-10910-5
