= Birkdale Palace railway station =

Disused railway station in Birkdale, Merseyside

Birkdale Palace
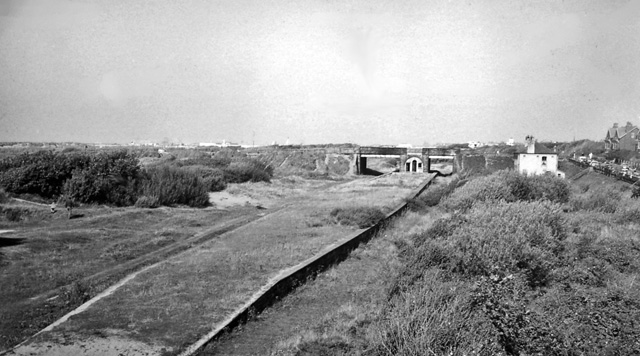
- Remains of the station in 1964

General information
- Location: Birkdale, Sefton; England
- Coordinates: 53.6388°N 3.0269°W
- Grid reference: SD322163
- Platforms: 2 (island)

Other information
- Status: Disused

History
- Original company: Southport & Cheshire Lines Extension Railway
- Pre-grouping: Cheshire Lines Committee
- Post-grouping: Cheshire Lines Committee

Key dates
- 1 September 1884: Station opened
- 1 January 1917: Station closed
- 1 April 1919: Station reopened
- 7 January 1952: Station closed to passengers
- 7 July 1952: Station closed completely
Location

Birkdale Palace railway station was located in Birkdale, Lancashire, England. The station was opened by the Southport & Cheshire Lines Extension Railway in 1884 and closed in 1952.

== History ==
The Southport & Cheshire Lines Extension Railway (SCLER) opened Birkdale Palace on 1 September 1884 as an intermediate station on the line from Southport Lord Street railway station. The station was located next to the Birkdale Palace Hotel (now closed and demolished) and was positioned between Palace Road and Weld Road.

It had an island platform, accessible via the Weld Road bridge. The station first closed on 1 January 1917, along with all other stations on the extension line, as part of a World War I economy measure.

The station reopened on 1 April 1919 and remained in use until 7 January 1952, when the SCLER ceased passenger services between Aintree Central and Southport Lord Street. The line remained open for goods traffic at Southport Lord Street, Birkdale Palace, and Altcar & Hillhouse stations until 7 July 1952. Public goods facilities were also closed at Woodvale, Lydiate, and Sefton & Maghull stations on the same date. No goods facilities were provided at Ainsdale Beach station. After 7 July 1952, a siding at Altcar & Hillhouse remained open for private goods traffic until May 1960. The last passenger train to run on the SCLER was a railway enthusiast special between Aintree and Altcar & Hillhouse on 6 June 1959.

Note: Regarding the closure dates of railway stations or lines, the official date of closure is typically given as the Monday following the last train service. As the closure date of Monday, 7 January 1952, was a Saturday, the actual last day of services was Saturday, 5 January 1952. This is confirmed by last-day tickets bearing the 5 January date.

== After closure ==
Later, the route was converted into Coastal Road, which runs from Woodvale to Southport. At the site of the former Birkdale Palace station, the road now runs west of the original trackbed.

| Preceding station | Disused railways | Following station |
|---|---|---|
| Ainsdale Beach | Cheshire Lines Committee; SCLER | Southport Lord Street |
