= Mossbridge railway station =

Former railway station in England

Mossbridge
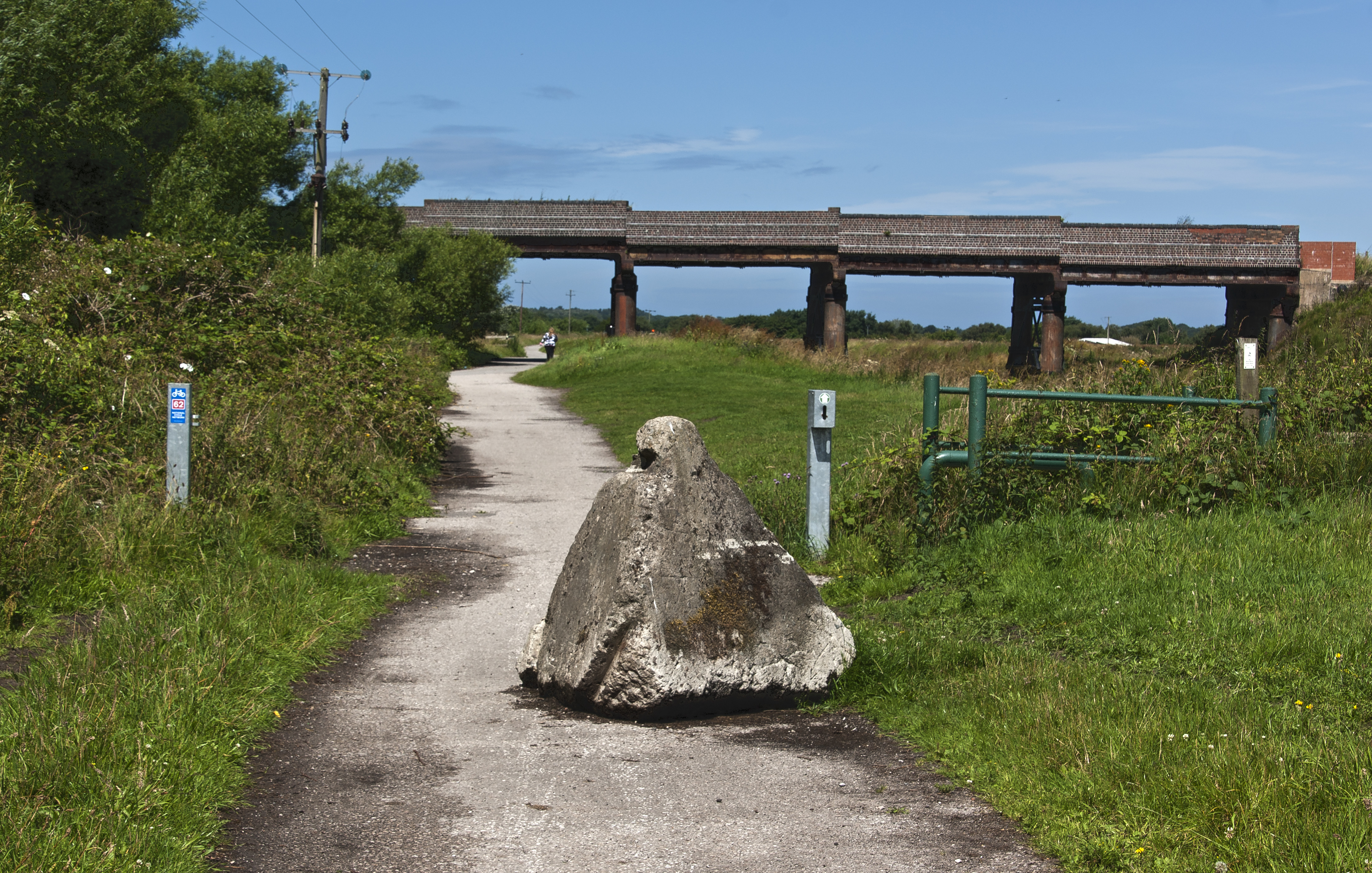
- Approximate location of the former station (2016)

General information
- Location: Downholland, West Lancashire; England
- Coordinates: 53.5671°N 3.0135°W
- Grid reference: SD330083
- Platforms: 2

Other information
- Status: Disused

History
- Original company: Southport & Cheshire Lines Extension Railway
- Pre-grouping: Cheshire Lines Committee
- Post-grouping: Cheshire Lines Committee

Key dates
- 5 April 1886: Station opened as "Barton & Halsall"
- 1 August 1894: Renamed "Mossbridge"
- 1 January 1917: Station closed to passengers
- December 1928: Station closed completely
Location

Mossbridge railway station was located on Downholland Moss at Moss Lane, Haskayne, Lancashire, England. The Southport & Cheshire Lines Extension Railway (SCLER) opened Mossbridge on 5 April 1886 as "Barton & Halsall".

A short distance north of the station the line crossed Downholland Brook by a substantial bridge.

The station closed in 1917, along with all other stations on the extension line, as a World War I economy measure. Unlike all the others, however, Mossbridge never reopened to passengers.

This part of the SCLER now forms part of the Trans Pennine Trail.

Preceding station	Disused railways	Following station
Altcar and Hillhouse	Cheshire Lines Committee; SCLER	Woodvale
