= Lydiate railway station =

Former railway station in England

Lydiate
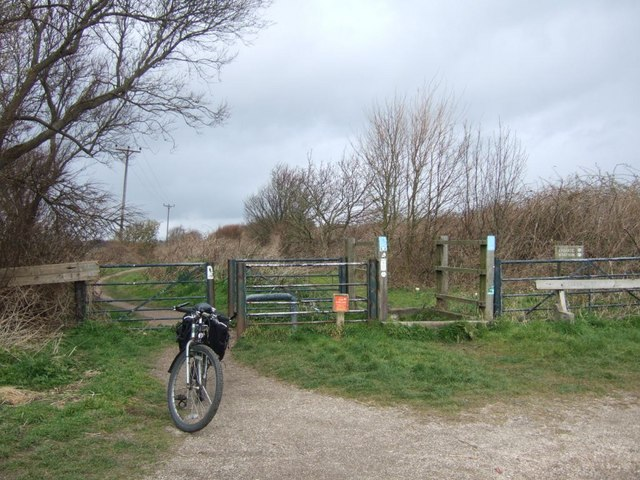
- Trans-Pennine Trail on the site of the former station (2008)

General information
- Location: Lydiate/Great Altcar, (Note: The site of Lydiate railway station on Carr Lane is about 835 feet (255 m) outside the current boundaries of Lydiate and is actually located in Great Altcar.) West Lancashire; England
- Coordinates: 53.5320°N 2.9736°W
- Grid reference: SD355044
- Platforms: 2

Other information
- Status: Disused

History
- Original company: Southport & Cheshire Lines Extension Railway
- Pre-grouping: Cheshire Lines Committee
- Post-grouping: Cheshire Lines Committee

Key dates
- 1 September 1884: Station opened
- 1 January 1917: Station closed
- 1 April 1919: Station reopened
- 7 January 1952: Station closed completely
Location

Lydiate railway station was a station located on the Southport & Cheshire Lines Extension Railway off Carr Lane, just outside Lydiate. The Merseyside and Lancashire border runs down the stream alongside Altcar Lane, which runs parallel to the line.

The station first closed in 1917, along with all other stations on the extension line, as a World War I economy measure.

The station was reopened on 1 April 1919, and continued in use until 7 January 1952, when the SCLER was closed to passengers from Aintree Central to Southport Lord Street. The line remained open for public goods traffic until 7 July 1952 at Southport Lord St., Birkdale Palace and Altcar & Hillhouse Stations. Public goods facilities were ended at Woodvale, Lydiate and Sefton & Maghull stations on the same date as passenger services (7 January 1952) (Note: On the subject of railway station or line 'closing dates', it should be remembered that the official day of a closure is always given as the Monday following the date of last trains run. As this is almost always a Saturday, if 7 January 1952 (Monday) is given as the date of closure, this means the actual last day of services was Saturday, 5 January 1952. This is proven by last day tickets which bear the date 5 January.) and there were never any goods facilities at Ainsdale Beach station to begin with. After 7 July 1952, a siding remained open at Altcar & Hillhouse for private goods facilities until May 1960. The last passenger train to run on the SCLER was a railway enthusiasts 'special' between Aintree and Altcar & Hillhouse railways stations on 6 June 1959.

== Notes and references ==
=== Sources ===
- Bolger, Paul (1984). An Illustrated History of the Cheshire Lines Committee. Merseyside: Heyday Publishing Company. ISBN 0-947562-00-1.

Preceding station	Disused railways	Following station
Sefton and Maghull	Cheshire Lines Committee; SCLER	Altcar and Hillhouse
