= Scotch Piper Inn =

Listed pub in Merseyside, England

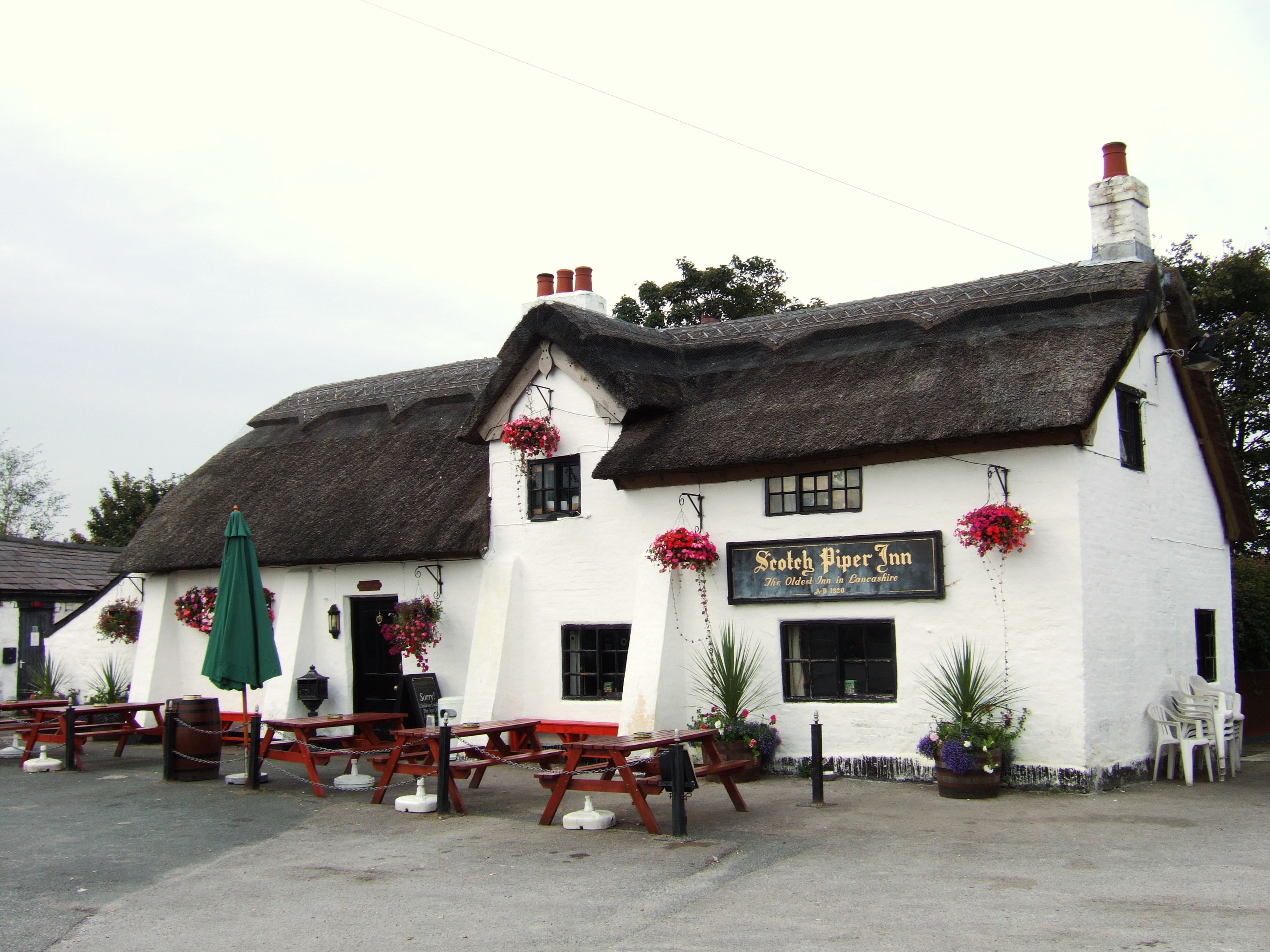
- The pub in 2007

- Location within Merseyside

General information
- Type: Public house
- Location: Southport Road, Lydiate, Merseyside, England
- Coordinates: 53.5364°N 2.96°W
- Year built: 1320 (probably 16th century)
- Owner: Admiral Taverns

Design and construction
- Designations

Listed Building – Grade II*
- Official name: The Scotch Piper public house
- Designated: 11 October 1968
- Reference no.: 1343315

Website
- scotchpiper.com

The Scotch Piper Inn is a Grade II* listed public house on Southport Road in Lydiate, a village in Merseyside, England. The oldest pub in the historic county of Lancashire, it stands on the A5147, 9 miles (14 km) from Liverpool and 11 miles (18 km) from Southport. It is close to the site of Lydiate Hall and next to the remains of St Catherine's Chapel.

== History ==
The fabric of the building is thought to date from 1320, although most of the present structure is probably from the 16th century. Dendrochronological analysis carried out following a thatch fire in 1985 dated some of the building's timbers to around 1550. It was originally known as the Royal Oak. It was renamed the Scotch Piper in honour of an injured Scottish piper associated with the Jacobite Rebellion, who is said to have visited the inn in the 18th century. A northern bay was added in the 18th century.

The Moorcroft family were landlords from the 1880s until 1945. When the property was sold to its tenant in 1922, it included five acres of land and livestock, reflecting the traditional combination of farming and innkeeping. The Moorcroft family sold the pub to Burtonwood Brewery in 1945, and it subsequently remained under the management of the same family until 2014. Alterations carried out after Burtonwood's acquisition included the installation of brick fireplaces that remain a feature of the interior.

On 11 October 1968, the Scotch Piper was designated a Grade II* listed building. The Campaign for Real Ale (CAMRA) regards it as having an interior of "outstanding national historic importance" and awards it a three-star rating on its National Inventory of Historic Pub Interiors.

The pub became known for hosting a large weekly motorcycle gathering, which by the late 20th century regularly attracted hundreds of riders. Tony Blair visited the Scotch Piper in 1999 during his first term as prime minister.

Following a thatch fire in 1985, the central gable was rebuilt in its present form. The pub suffered severe fire damage to its thatched roof on 6 December 2016, the fifth recorded roof fire at the building since the 1920s. The main structure of the roof and fabric of the building were saved, and the pub re-opened in April 2017. The restoration works included the conversion of former living accommodation into an additional customer room. As of December 2025, the freehold was owned by Admiral Taverns.

== Events ==
The Scotch Piper Classics is a popular car meet held at the pub every Monday evening and every third Sunday of the month. There is also a bike meet every Wednesday.

== Architecture ==
=== Exterior ===
The two-storey cruck framed whitewashed brick building retains a thatched roof. It is in three bays. The left two bays are in a single storey, and contain at least two cruck trusses; it was encased in brick in the 17th century. The right bay was rebuilt in the 18th century, using fabric from Lydiate Hall, and is 1 1/2 storeys in height. Later additions were made to the rear and left side of the building. The front elevation has four battered buttresses and horizontally sliding sash windows, including two and three-light examples with glazing bars. The main entrance has a four-panel door, and a gabled dormer rises from the central bay. The rebuilt eastern bay has higher eaves and an attic window. The building also retains two brick chimney stacks.

=== Interior ===
The interior retains exposed timber framing, including substantial cruck timbers. The pub is arranged as a sequence of rooms running the length of the building, with the servery and public bar at the western end. The servery retains its historic form, including small glazed panels, although the present bar-back shelving was installed in 1997. Until then, glazing enclosed the entire servery and service was provided through a hatch.

The left-hand and central rooms retain historic fittings, including timber benches, partitions and other surviving woodwork. Alterations carried out after Burtonwood Brewery acquired the pub in 1945 included the installation of brick fireplaces and decorative concrete faux-timbering above the fireplaces in the left-hand and central rooms. Other changes included the replacement of the ceiling and floor in the left-hand room.

The central room retains a beamed ceiling, exposed structural timbers and fitted bench seating. Its brick fireplace, added in 1945, is set beneath an inglenook. The eastern room, originally used for storage and later as the landlady's sitting room, retains working bell pushes from the period of table service and historic bench seating, although its 1945 fireplace was replaced with a cast-iron example in 2010.

Following the pub's reopening in 2017, former living accommodation to the rear of the servery was converted into an additional public room, creating a fourth public space.

== See also ==
- Listed buildings in Lydiate
- Grade II* listed buildings in Merseyside

== Bibliography ==
- Pollard, Richard; Pevsner, Nikolaus (2006), Lancashire: Liverpool and the South-West, The Buildings of England, New Haven and London: Yale University Press, ISBN 0-300-10910-5
