= Aintree Central railway station =

Former railway station in Liverpool, England

Aintree Central

General information
- Location: Aintree, Sefton; England
- Coordinates: 53.4731°N 2.9584°W
- Grid reference: SJ365978
- Platforms: 5*

Other information
- Status: Disused

History
- Original company: Cheshire Lines Committee
- Pre-grouping: Cheshire Lines Committee
- Post-grouping: Cheshire Lines Committee

Key dates
- 13 July 1880: Station opened as Aintree Racecourse CLC
- 1 September 1884: Station renamed Aintree (CLC)
- 1 July 1950: Station renamed Aintree Central
- 7 November 1960: Station closed to regular traffic
- March 1963: Station closed to race traffic
- 7 December 1964: Station closed to public goods traffic
Location

Aintree Central railway station was a station located on the North Liverpool Extension Line on Park Lane, Aintree, Merseyside, across Park Lane from the current Aintree station.

== History ==
The station opened on 13 July 1880 as Aintree Racecourse for racedays at Aintree Racecourse. It was renamed Aintree on the opening of the Southport & Cheshire Lines Extension Railway on 1 September 1884. In 1950 it was renamed once more becoming Aintree Central.

The line was opened by the Cheshire Lines Committee (CLC), in direct competition with the L&Y's Liverpool Exchange to Southport Chapel Street service. However, it was never as successful because the CLC's route was much longer than that of the L&Y, serving areas within South Liverpool and along to Hunts Cross, before going north again up to Aintree.

On 7 January 1952 the Liverpool Central to Southport Lord Street service ended, leaving Aintree Central as the terminus for all trains from Liverpool.

The station finally closed to passengers on 7 November 1960 and then to race traffic in March 1963. It finally closed on 7 December 1964 with the withdrawal of freight traffic (except for private sidings).

Today, no evidence of the station's existence remains, as the site is buried under an industrial estate, located off Park Lane.

Preceding station	Disused railways	Following station
Warbreck	Cheshire Lines Committee; SCLER	Sefton and Maghull
Warbreck	Cheshire Lines Committee; North Liverpool Extension Line	Terminus
Warbreck	LYR; Liverpool, Ormskirk and Preston Railway	Old Roan
