= Lydiate Hall =

Building in Lydiate, Merseyside, England

Coordinates: 53.5388°N 2.9631°W

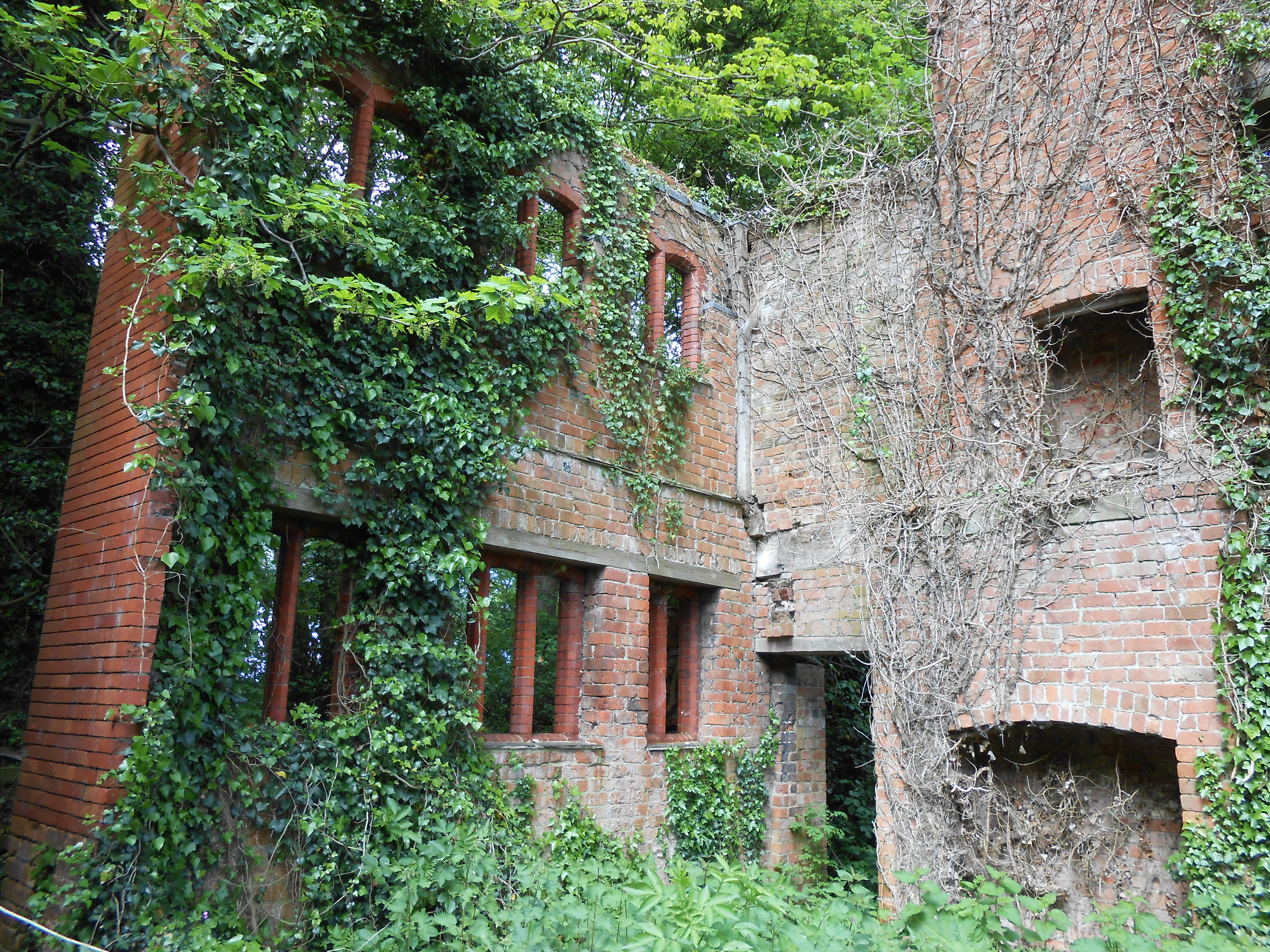
- Lydiate Hall in 2014
- Interactive map of the Lydiate Hall area

General information
- Location: Lydiate, England

Lydiate Hall was a 16th-century hall in Lydiate, Merseyside, England. The hall was a black-and-white half-timbered house, and was similar in design to Speke Hall. The hall was accompanied by a private chapel. It was a known Catholic house during the time of Elizabeth I of England, and the building contained at least three priest holes. The hall became a ruin in the early 20th century, and is now part of the grounds of Lydiate Hall Farm on Southport Road, Lydiate. It is now part of a conservation area, along with the nearby Scotch Piper Inn and St Catherine's Chapel. Its ruins were Grade II listed in 1968.

== History ==
=== Construction and early history ===
The building was constructed in the 15th and 16th century, and was altered in the 19th century. The founders were Laurence Ireland and his wife Katherine Blundell. Ireland is believed to have been responsible for the later extensions to the house sometime around 1451. The hall and its chapel were inherited by Edward Ireland in 1609. The building was originally a quadrangle plan with an enclosed courtyard, with the front being the oldest portion of stone construction and surrounded by a moat. During the late 18th century, then owner Henry Blundell authorised significant demolition of the hall, particularly the areas that were considered picturesque and in turn removing all trace of the principle frontage.

=== 19th century ===
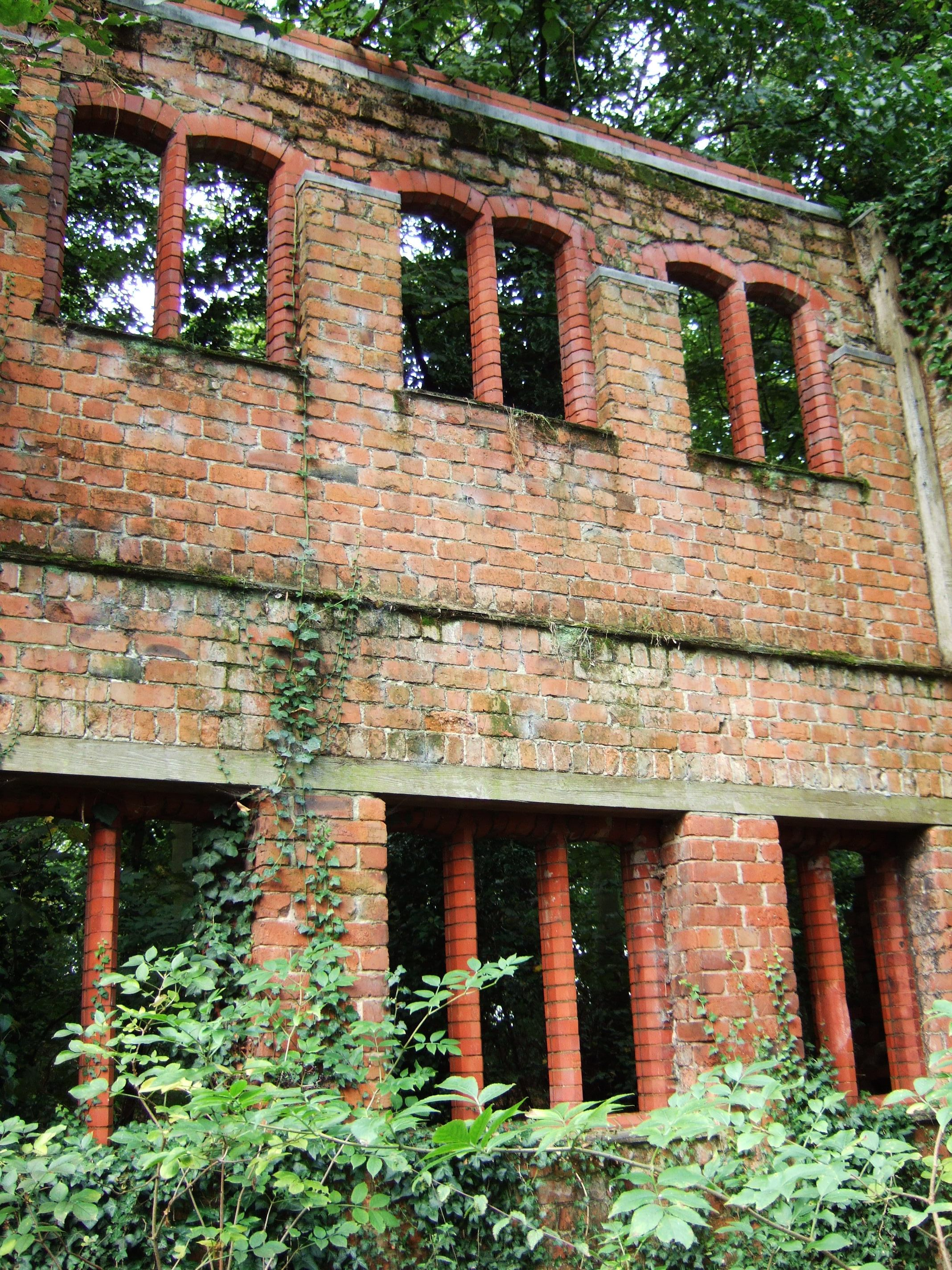
Ruins as pictured in 2007

A fire was reported to have alighted in the wash-house in November 1877. The burning smell attracted attention from local people and was quickly extinguished. Concerns were expressed that any fire starting in the building could result in its total destruction due to its significant quantities of ancient oak. By the late 1880s, the hall, then owned by Mr Weld-Blundell of Ince, it was described as "fast decaying". and as being in a dilapidated state, with no repairs being undertaken. In 1907, the unoccupied property was burgled of its family heirloom paintings, which had to remain in the property under a clause in the will of a previous owner. The stolen artwork were cut from their frames, with the thieves said to "have gone about their work with great deliberation".

=== 20th century ===
As of the 20th century, the foundations exist, along with the brick and stone structure with 19th century windows on the ground and first floor; the timber-framed hall was completely demolished. A partial collar and strut roof with moulded tie beams remained as of 1985, as well as a Tudor-headed fireplace with shield and cornice and a 19th-century range. In 1994, a planning application for Listed Building Consent was submitted to Sefton Council, proposing the partial demolition of areas of the old hall that were deemed to be unstable, to allow for archaeological research. By this time, there was no surviving timber from the 16th century of earlier, with just a single stone chimney stack the oldest feature to be intact. Preservation proposals continued to be reported in early 1996, with the home, believed to have at one time been owned by Lord William Lever, was being held together with scaffold.

== See also ==
- Listed buildings in Lydiate
