= Southport and Cheshire Lines Extension Railway =

Overview
- Locale: Lancashire; Merseyside

Technical
- Track gauge: 4 ft 8 1/2 in (1,435 mm) standard gauge

The Southport and Cheshire Lines Extension Railway was an early British railway company operating in the then county of Lancashire. It was constructed to link the Cheshire Lines Committee railway at Aintree to Southport. It operated from 1884 to 1952.

== History ==
Southport and Cheshire Lines Extension Railway Act 1881
- Act of Parliament
- Parliament of the United Kingdom
- Long title: An Act for making a Railway in Lancashire, to be called the Southport and Cheshire Lines Extension Railway; and for other purposes.
- Citation: 44 & 45 Vict. c. cxciii

Dates
- Royal assent: 11 August 1881

Text of statute as originally enacted

Southport and Cheshire Lines Extension Railway Act 1882
- Act of Parliament
- Parliament of the United Kingdom
- Long title: An Act to authorise the Southport and Cheshire Lines Extension Railway Company to extend their Railway into the Borough of Southport to divert a portion of their authorised Railway and for other purposes.
- Citation: 45 & 46 Vict. c. cclxi

Dates
- Royal assent: 18 August 1882

Text of statute as originally enacted

The Southport and Cheshire Lines Extension Railway was authorised by two acts of Parliament, the Southport and Cheshire Lines Extension Railway Act 1881 (44 & 45 Vict. c. cxciii) of 11 August 1881 and the Southport and Cheshire Lines Extension Railway Act 1882 (45 & 46 Vict. c. cclxi) of 18 August 1882, the first authorising the line as far as Birkdale and the second the remaining section to Southport Lord Street. It was promoted by the Cheshire Lines Committee (CLC) and was a natural extension of their North Liverpool Extension Line to Southport.

Southport and Cheshire Lines Extension Railway Act 1885
- Act of Parliament
- Parliament of the United Kingdom
- Long title: An Act to empower the Southport and Cheshire Lines Extension Railway Company to raise further Money; to confirm Agreements with reference to the working of their Railway by the Cheshire Lines Committee; and for other purposes.
- Citation: 48 & 49 Vict. c. liii

Dates
- Royal assent: 25 June 1885

Text of statute as originally enacted

Southport and Cheshire Lines Extension Railway Act 1889
- Act of Parliament
- Parliament of the United Kingdom
- Long title: An Act to regulate the capital of the Southport and Cheshire Lines Extension Railway Company, and to confirm agreements between the Company and other railway companies; and for other purposes.
- Citation: 52 & 53 Vict. c. lxx

Dates
- Royal assent: 9 July 1889

Text of statute as originally enacted

Southport and Cheshire Lines Extension Railway Act 1892
- Act of Parliament
- Parliament of the United Kingdom
- Long title: An Act to confer further powers on the Southport and Cheshire Lines Extension Railway Company and for other purposes.
- Citation: 55 & 56 Vict. c. xcv

Dates
- Royal assent: 20 June 1892

Text of statute as originally enacted

The 14 miles 3 chains (22.6 km) line was built as a double track railway opening on 1 September 1884. The line was worked by the CLC under arrangements made in its acts of Parliament, these acts were ratified and amended by the Southport and Cheshire Lines Extension Railway Act 1889 (52 & 53 Vict. c. lxx) to allow working with other companies.

The railway remained independent until nationalisation in 1948.

== Route ==
- North Liverpool Extension Line
- Aintree Central, Aintree. 13 July 1880 – 7 November 1960.
- Southport Junction
- Junction with Liverpool, Ormskirk and Preston Railway
- Sefton and Maghull, Maghull. 1884–1952.
- Lydiate, Lydiate. 1884–1952.
- Altcar and Hillhouse, Altcar 1884–1952.
- Junction with Liverpool, Southport and Preston Junction Railway 1884.
- Mossbridge 1884–1917.
- Woodvale, Woodvale. 1884–1952.
- Ainsdale Beach, Ainsdale. 1901–1952.
- Birkdale Palace, Birkdale. 1884–1952.
- Southport Lord Street, Southport. 1884–1952.

== Closure ==
Passenger services ended 7 January 1952 and goods six months later. The line remained in intermittent use from Aintree to Altcar and Hillhouse to provide access to private sidings until May 1960, when the line was finally lifted.

== The route today ==
The trackbed forms part of National Cycle Network Route 62, the Trans Pennine Trail. From Woodvale northwards the trail is joined by the Southport Coastal Road.

In January 2019, the Campaign for Better Transport released a report identifying the line which was listed as Priority 2 for reopening. Priority 2 is for those lines which require further development or a change in circumstances (such as housing developments).

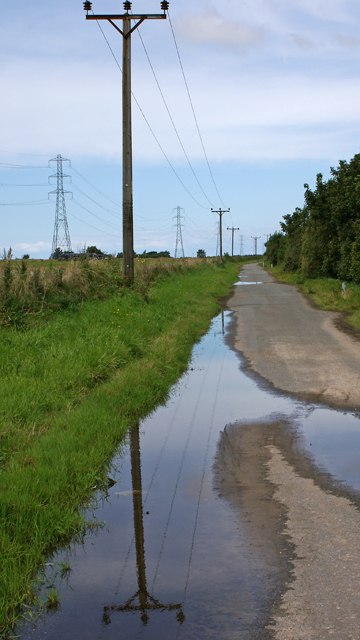
The Trans-Pennine Trail at Maghull

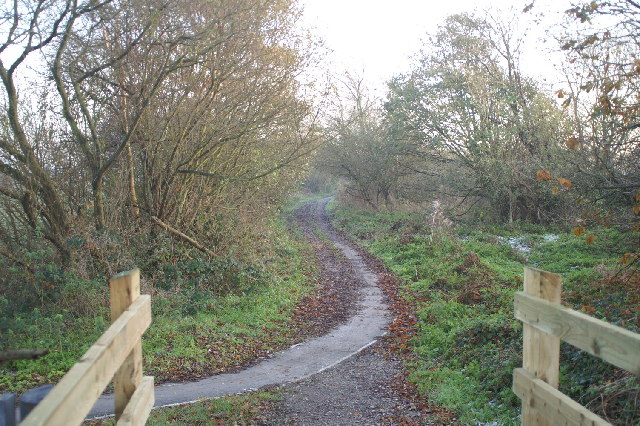
Cycle Path

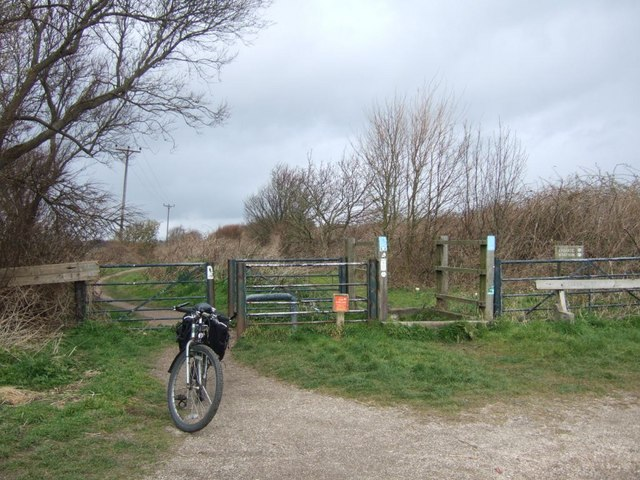
Trans-Pennine Trail

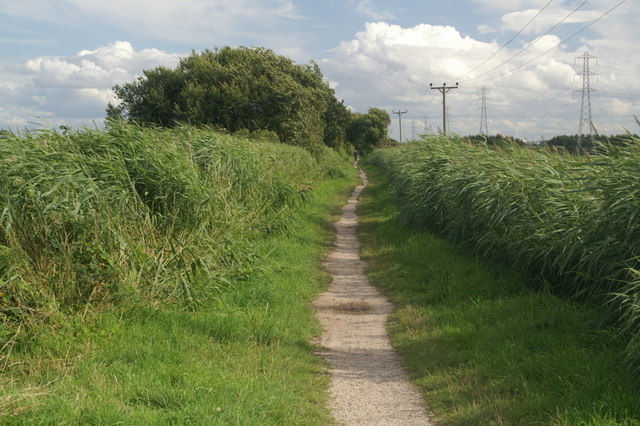
Cheshire Lines path, near Lydiate

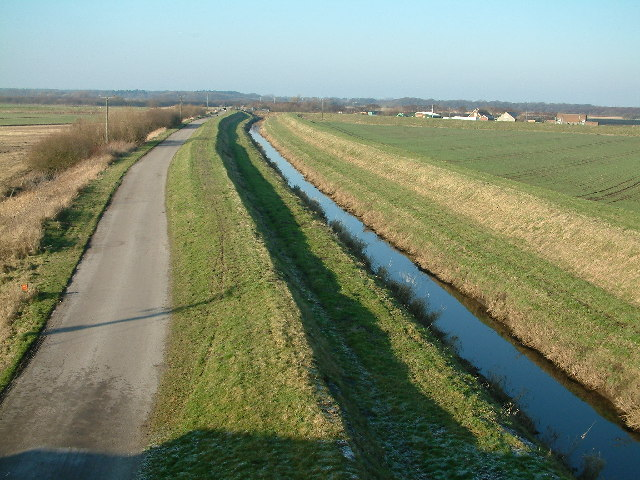
Cheshire Lines Cycle-way
