= Sefton and Maghull railway station =

Former railway station in England

Sefton and Maghull

General information
- Location: Maghull, Sefton; England
- Coordinates: 53.5078°N 2.9583°W
- Grid reference: SD365017
- Platforms: 2

Other information
- Status: Disused

History
- Original company: Southport & Cheshire Lines Extension Railway
- Pre-grouping: Cheshire Lines Committee
- Post-grouping: Cheshire Lines Committee

Key dates
- 1 September 1884: Opened as "Sefton"
- 1886: Renamed "Sefton & Maghull"
- 1 January 1917: Closed
- 1 April 1919: Reopened
- 7 January 1952: Closed completely
Location

Sefton and Maghull railway station was a station located on the Southport & Cheshire Lines Extension Railway on Sefton Lane, Maghull, Merseyside, England.

== History ==
The station opened on 1 September 1884 as Sefton, and was renamed in 1886 as Sefton and Maghull. The station first closed in 1917, along with all other stations on the extension line, as a WWI economy measure.

The station was reopened on 1 April 1919, and continued in use until 7 January 1952, when the SCLER was closed to passengers from Aintree Central to Southport Lord Street. The line remained open for public goods traffic until 7 July 1952 at Southport Lord St., Birkdale Palace and Altcar & Hillhouse Stations. Public goods facilities were ended at Woodvale, Lydiate and Sefton & Maghull stations on the same date as passenger services (7 January 1952*) and there were never any goods facilities at Ainsdale Beach station to begin with. After 7 July 1952, a siding remained open at Altcar & Hillhouse for private goods facilities until May 1960. The last passenger train to run on the SCLER was a railway enthusiasts 'special' between Aintree and Altcar and Hillhouse railways stations on 6 June 1959.

The official day of a closure is given as the Monday following the date of the last train to run. As this is almost always a Saturday, if 7 January 1952 (Monday) is given as the date of closure, this means the last day of service was Saturday, 5 January 1952. This can be shown by last day tickets bearing the 5 January date.

Preceding station	Disused railways	Following station
Aintree Central	Cheshire Lines Committee; SCLER	Lydiate
