= Lydiate =

Coordinates: 53.536°N 2.959°W

- Village
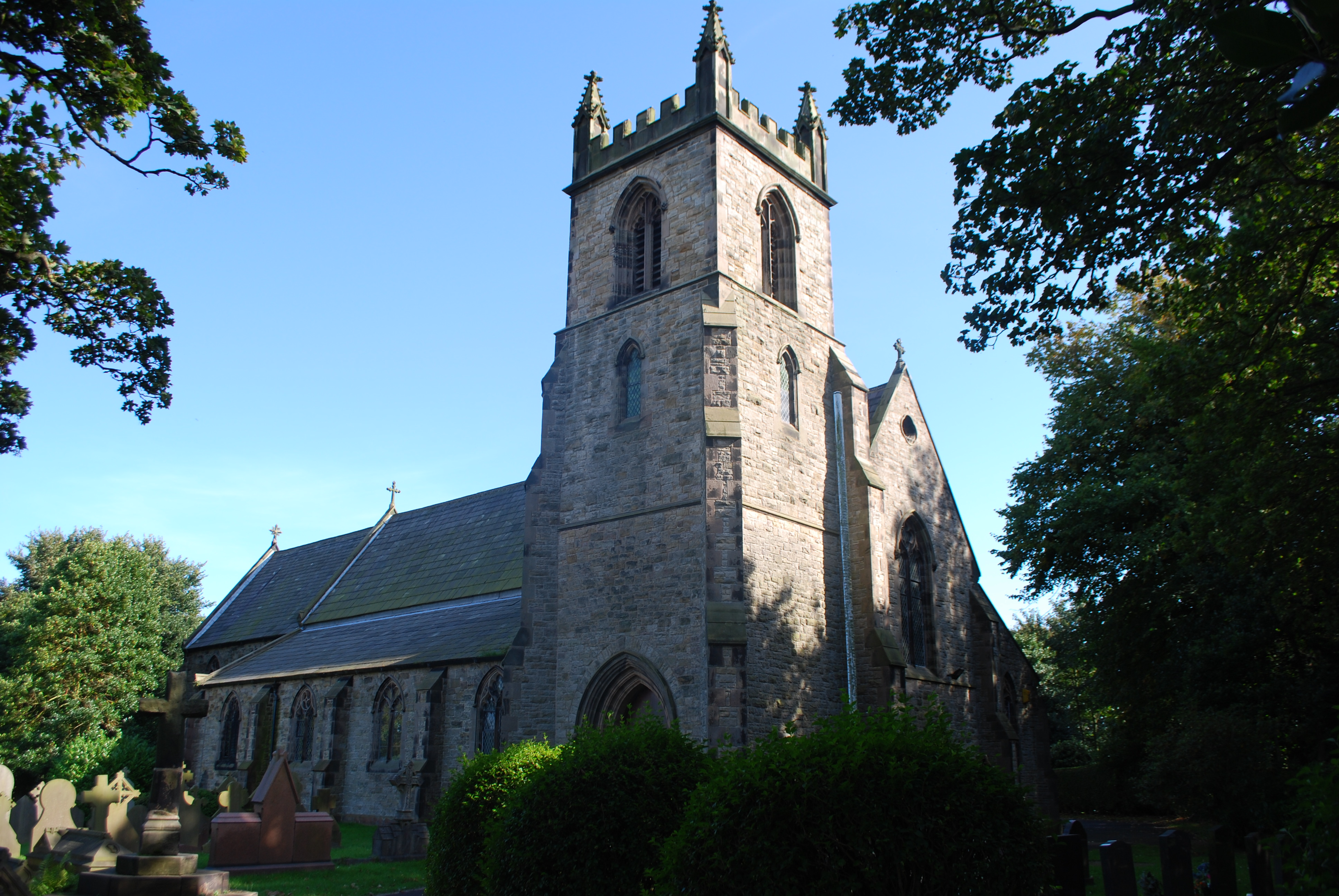
- St. Thomas' Church, Lydiate

- Location within Merseyside
- Population: 6,308 (2011 Census)
- OS grid reference: SD368040
- Civil parish: Lydiate
- Metropolitan borough: Sefton
- Metropolitan county: Merseyside
- Region: North West
- Country: England
- Sovereign state: United Kingdom
- Post town: LIVERPOOL
- Postcode district: L31
- Dialling code: 0151
- Police: Merseyside
- Fire: Merseyside
- Ambulance: North West
- UK Parliament: Sefton Central

Lydiate is a village and civil parish in the Metropolitan Borough of Sefton in Merseyside (historically in Lancashire), England. It is located 1.5 miles (2 km) north of Maghull, with which it has a common history. At the 2001 Census the civil parish of Lydiate had a population of 6,672, reducing to 6,308 at the 2011 Census.

== History ==
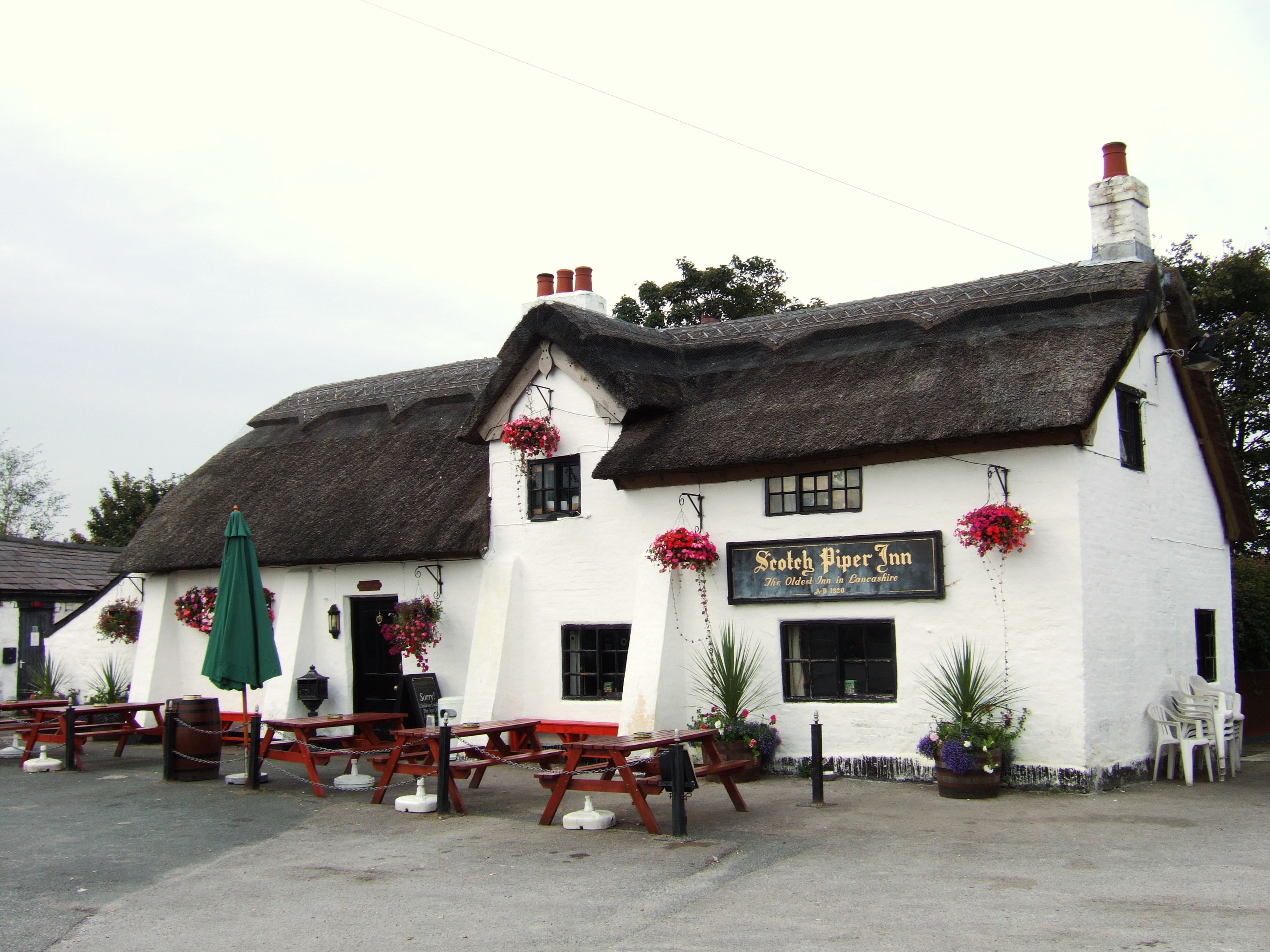
Scotch Piper Inn, est. 1320, is reputed to be the oldest inn in Lancashire.

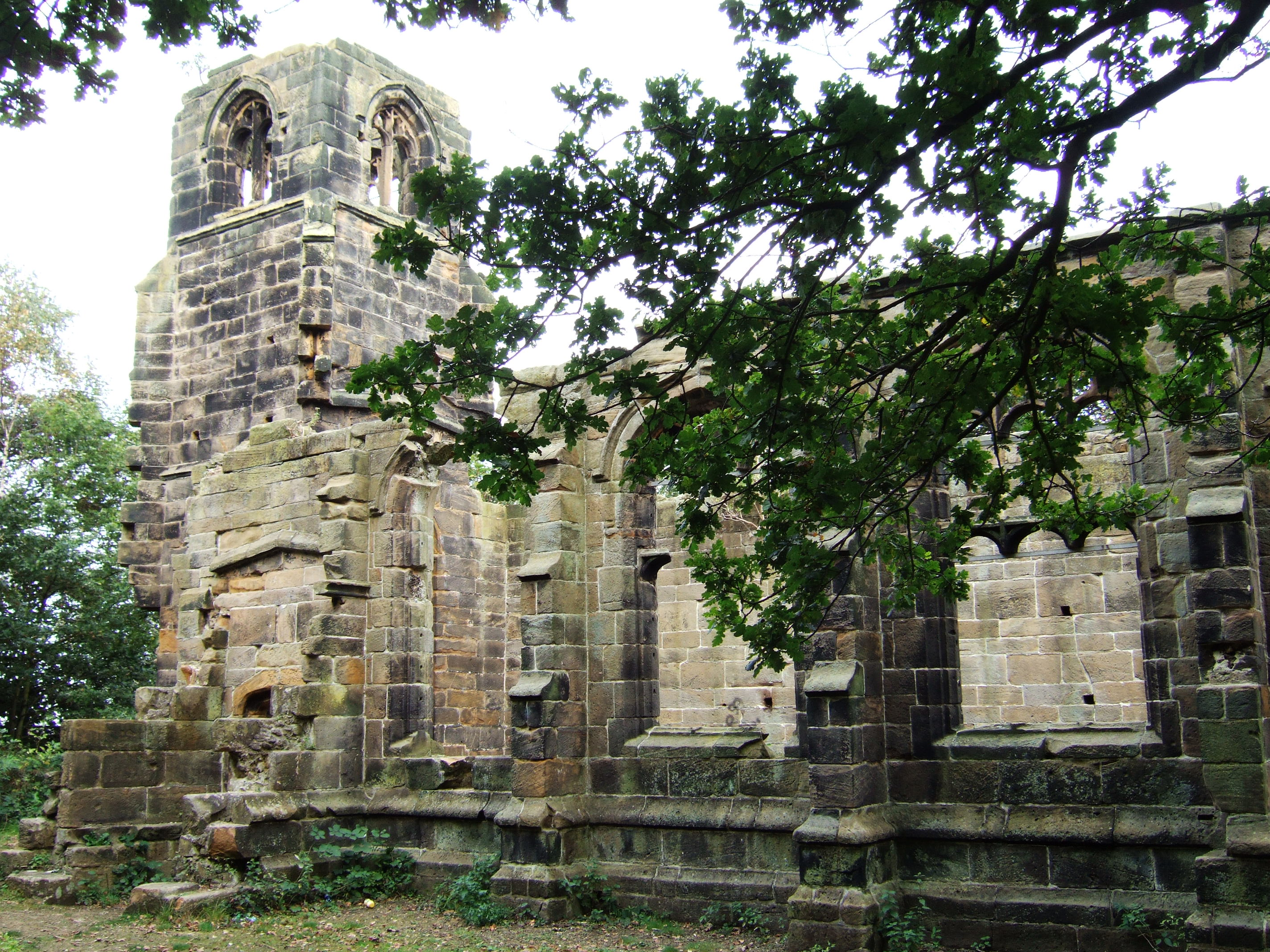
The ruins of St Catherine's Chapel, built c.1500 and believed abandoned around fifty years later.

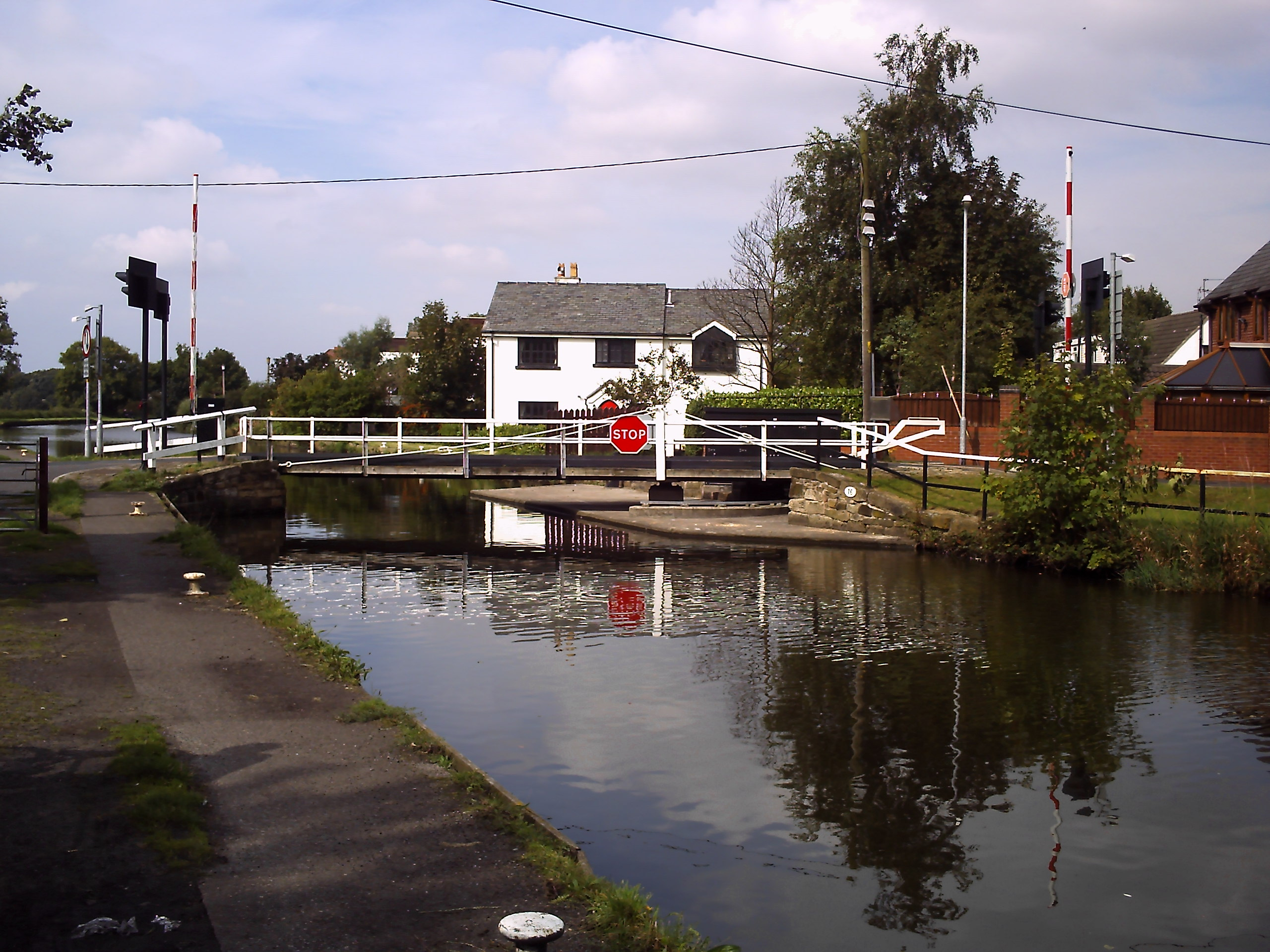
Bell's Swing Bridge No. 16

There is evidence that the settlement of the area dates back to at least the middle of the 10th century. Indeed, one possible root of the name is the Old English hlid-geat meaning 'swing gate', which would have an association with animal farming. Lydiate is mentioned in the Domesday Book, and is described as having a "wood a mile long", and there is evidence of the existence of extensive forests at that time, particularly of oak and elm.

The Scotch Piper Inn, located today on the A5147, Southport Road, is reputed to be the oldest inn in Lancashire and dates from the 14th century. For many years the pub was owned and run by the Moorcroft family. Originally called the "Royal Oak", the inn was built around an oak tree which can be seen in both the tap room and the front bar to the left of the fireplace. The inn is now a Grade II* listed building.

The Ireland family were very influential in the area in the early 15th century, and Lydiate Hall was built by Lawrence Ireland sometime around 1470. The eastern part of the hall was destroyed about 1780, and the hall was abandoned completely by the late 19th century. Only ruins exist today.

The nearby St Catherine's Chapel, commonly known as Lydiate Abbey, appears to date from the same period, with the initials of Lawrence Ireland and his wife, Catherine Blundell, located on the porch. The abbey appears to have been abandoned when the practice of the Catholic religion was prohibited. The graveyard within the curtilage of the chapel was used by local Catholic families into the later 19th century.

== Governance ==
From 1997 until 2010 the village and civil parish of Lydiate was part of the Knowsley North and Sefton East constituency represented by George Howarth, a Labour Party MP.

As a result of boundary revisions for the 2010 general election the Knowsley North and Sefton East constituency was abolished with Sefton East, including Lydiate, being merged with the northern parts of the former Crosby constituency, which was also abolished, to form the new Sefton Central constituency which is represented by the Labour Party MP Bill Esterson.

== Geography ==
The south of the village is suburban in nature with residences and some light industry. The remainder of the village, especially to the north and west, is more rural, consisting largely of flat arable land.

The parish church of St Thomas and the Roman Catholic Church of Our Lady are situated at the very north of Lydiate. The Catholic Church of St Gregory the Great is situated further south, off Liverpool Road. St Thomas CE Primary School, St Gregory's Catholic Primary School and Lydiate Primary School, formerly Lydiate County Primary, often know because of its location as Lambshear Lane Primary School, also lie within the village.

The Weld Blundell (pronounced "Well Blundell") pub is opposite Lydiate's village green, which is little more than a few square metres in area and has a bus stop. The Weld Blundell in Lydiate shares its name with an establishment of the same name in Ince Blundell, now demolished and the site developed into a petrol station and coffee shop.

The Running Horses in Bells Lane was owned and run for many years by three generations of the Walton Family. It lies right beside the Leeds and Liverpool Canal. There was a coal business at the side, also run by the Walton family. At one time the coal was delivered by barge along the canal.

The Leeds and Liverpool Canal runs through the village on its way to the Liverpool Pier Head. The A59 road (Northway) and A5147 road (Southport Road) also run through the village. Until 1952 Lydiate was served by the Southport & Cheshire Lines Extension Railway, with a railway station on Station Road in the far north of the village. The former railway is now part of the Trans Pennine Trail.

== Development ==
In 2009 planning permission was sought to be a marina on the Leeds and Liverpool Canal by Bells Lane. The marina proposals were rejected at appeal in 2011.

== Notable people ==
- Oscar Gnosspelius, engineer.
- Ian Callaghan, former professional footballer, owned an insurance agency near the Weld Blundell.
- Bill Hartley, a British athlete, was raised in Lydiate and now runs a local floriculture business.
- Brian Labone, former professional footballer, lived in Lydiate.
- Terry Darracott, former professional footballer, lived in Lydiate.
- Gemma Merna, a British actress known as Carmel McQueen in TV soap Hollyoaks lives in Lydiate.

=== Notable visitors ===
- Gerard Manley Hopkins, poet and Jesuit priest, stayed in Lydiate at Rose Hill House, Pygons Hill Lane, between 1880 and 1881. Rose Hill House was the home of prominent local Catholic, Randall Lightbound and Hopkins was visiting to say Mass in the private chapel there. During his stay there he wrote the poem "Spring and Fall" and corresponded with poet Robert Bridges.

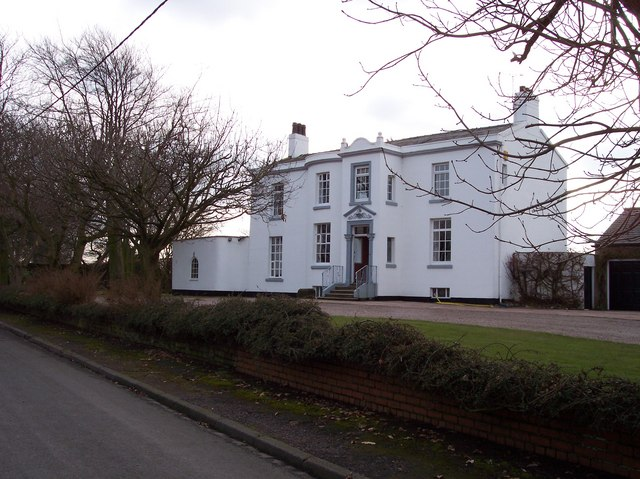

== See also ==
- Listed buildings in Lydiate
