= Southport Lord Street railway station =

Former railway station in Southport, England

Southport Lord Street
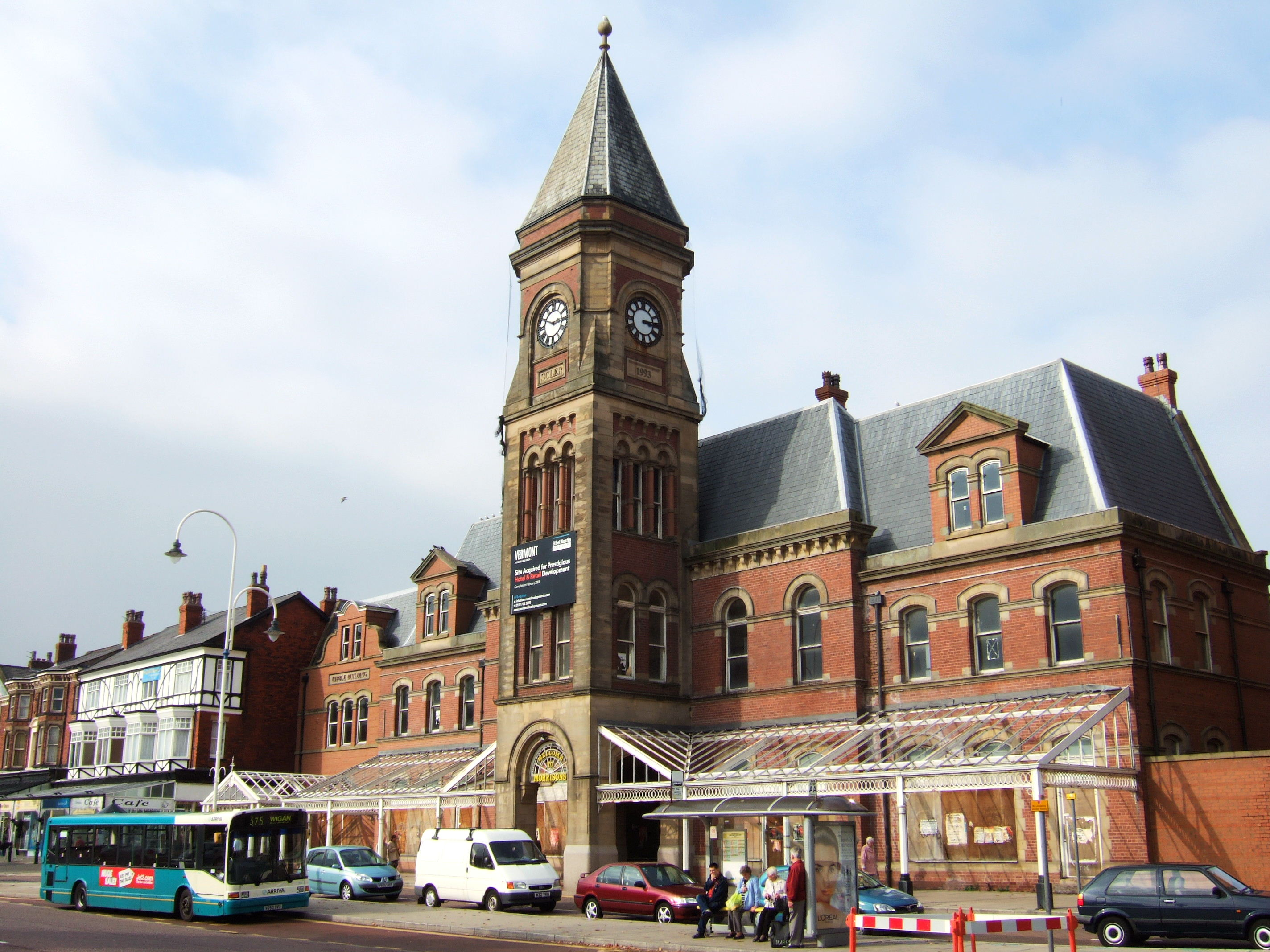
- The frontage of Southport Lord Street railway station, now part of a Travelodge hotel chain.

General information
- Location: Southport, Sefton; England
- Coordinates: 53.6452°N 3.0120°W
- Grid reference: SD331170
- Platforms: 5

Other information
- Status: Disused

History
- Original company: Southport & Cheshire Lines Extension Railway
- Pre-grouping: Cheshire Lines Committee
- Post-grouping: Cheshire Lines Committee

Key dates
- 1 September 1884: Station opened
- 1 January 1917: Station closed
- 1 April 1919: Station reopened
- 7 January 1952: Station closed to passengers
- 7 July 1952: Station closed completely
Location

Southport Lord Street (later also known as the Ribble Building, after being used by the Ribble Bus Company as a bus terminus) was a railway station located on Lord Street, Southport, Merseyside, England. It was the terminus of the Southport & Cheshire Lines Extension Railway from Liverpool.

The station closed in 1952, the building was subsequently used as a bus station and is now a hotel.

== Station history ==
The station opened on 1 September 1884, as the Southport & Cheshire Lines Extension Railway's (SCLER) northern terminus. The line ran from Aintree Central in the northern suburbs of Liverpool. The new line provided passengers with an alternative through route to Liverpool city centre, to that run by the Lancashire & Yorkshire Railway (Southport Chapel Street - Liverpool Exchange). It also provided an alternative route from Southport to Manchester.

From the outset the SCLER line was no competition to that of the L&Y's more direct coastal route, as the route of the Cheshire Lines Committee (CLC) into Liverpool skirted around the eastern areas of Liverpool, travelling down to Hunts Cross in the south and then back up to Liverpool Central High Level. The line only proving to be relatively popular during the summer months and never really taking off as a commuter route. Its heaviest traffic by far was for a short period in 1941 when the competing L&Y line had been severed by German bombing in the May Liverpool Blitz. During late 1942 the timetable showed five CLC trains each weekday to Southport of which two started at Manchester (Central).

The building itself was a grand affair, fronting directly onto Lord Street. The station had five platforms linked at their ends and by a footbridge. It had been intended by the SCLER to link their tracks to that of that L&Y's, providing the CLC with access to the northern suburbs of Southport. This had never been agreed with the LYR, so the provision of the footbridge on this basis, was speculative.

The station had a two track engine shed and turntable on the south side of the station yard. It closed on 7 July 1952 and was subsequently demolished.

The station first closed in 1917, along with all other stations on the extension line, as a World War I economy measure. It reopened in 1919, until 7 January 1952, when the SCLER was closed to passengers from Aintree Central northwards. The line remained open for public goods traffic until 7 July 1952 at Southport Lord Street, Birkdale Palace and Altcar & Hillhouse stations. Public goods facilities were ended at Woodvale, Lydiate and Sefton & Maghull stations on the same date as passenger services (7 January 1952) and there were never any goods facilities at Ainsdale Beach station to begin with. After 7 July 1952, a siding remained open at Altcar & Hillhouse for private goods facilities until May 1960. The last passenger train to run on part of the SCLER was a railway enthusiasts' 'special' between Aintree and Altcar & Hillhouse stations on 6 June 1959.

== Subsequent uses of building ==
After closure Southport Lord Street railway station was taken over by Ribble Buses. The spaces in between the platforms were filled in, but apart from that the interior remained the same. The trainshed remained in use by the bus company until Ribble Buses ceased to operate from the building in the 1990s. The trainshed was later demolished. The frontage on Lord Street was retained and exists today. The clock tower still shows 'SCLER' below the clock itself, making reference to its former role. Morrisons supermarket occupies the space behind the facade.

Work began in early 2013 on renovating the building as a six-storey, 101-bedroom Travelodge hotel and restaurant. Having been empty for over 10 years this was the first time a business had taken use of the building since Ribble Buses used it as a bus station. The hotel opened in 2014.

== Notes and references ==
=== Sources ===
- Bolger, Paul (1984). An Illustrated History of the Cheshire Lines Committee. Merseyside: Heyday Publishing Company. ISBN 978-0-947562-00-7.
- Dyckhoff, Nigel (1999). Portrait of the Cheshire Lines Committee. Shepperton: Ian Allan Publishing. ISBN 978-0-7110-2521-9.
- Gilbert, A.C.; Knight, N.R. (1975). Railways Around Lancashire, a Pictorial Survey. Castleton, Greater Manchester: Manchester Transport Museum Society. ISBN 978-0-900857-09-6.
- Griffiths, Roger; Smith, Paul (2000). The Directory of British Engine Sheds and Principal Locomotive Servicing Points: 2 North Midlands, Northern England and Scotland. OPC Railprint. ISBN 978-0-86093-548-3. OCLC 59558605.
- Marshall, John (1981). Forgotten Railways: North West England. Newton Abbot: David & Charles. ISBN 978-0-7153-8003-1.
- Travers, Ian (June 2013). Blakemore, Michael (ed.). "The Southport Extension of the Cheshire Lines Committee 1884-1952". Back Track. 27 (6). Easingwold: Pendragon Publishing.
- Welbourn, Nigel (2008). Liverpool and the Mersey (Lost Lines). Shepperton: Ian Allan. ISBN 978-0-7110-3190-6.

| Preceding station | Disused railways | Following station |
|---|---|---|
| Birkdale Palace; Line and station closed | Cheshire Lines Committee; SCLER | Terminus |
