= Woodvale, Merseyside =

Coordinates: 53.5881°N 3.0371°W

Woodvale
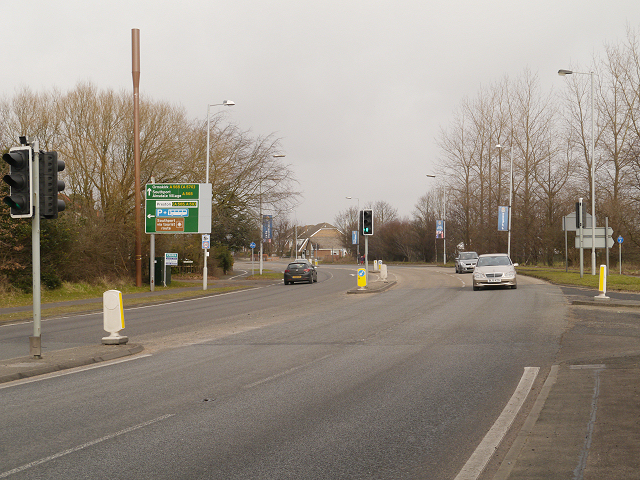
- Liverpool Road

- Location in Southport Location within Merseyside
- Metropolitan borough: Sefton
- Metropolitan county: Merseyside
- Region: North West
- Country: England
- Sovereign state: United Kingdom
- Post town: SOUTHPORT
- Postcode district: PR8
- Dialling code: 01704
- Police: Merseyside
- Fire: Merseyside
- Ambulance: North West
- UK Parliament: Southport; Sefton Central

Woodvale is the southernmost suburb of the town of Southport, Merseyside, England. It is situated between Formby and Ainsdale, to the north of RAF Woodvale. It used to hold the Woodvale Rally, a week-long event with classic cars, military vehicles, music, and other attractions, from 1969 to 2018. The event was held in the town's Victoria Park, and it was cancelled due to dispute with the park's management.
