= Richard George Masters =

- Born: 30 March 1877; Birkdale, Lancashire, England
- Died: 4 April 1963 (aged 86); Southport, Lancashire
- Burial place: St Cuthbert's Churchyard, Churchtown, Merseyside
- Military career
- Allegiance: United Kingdom
- Branch: British Army
- Rank: Private
- Units: Royal Army Service Corps
- Conflicts: World War I
- Awards: Victoria Cross; Croix de Guerre (France)

Richard George Masters VC (30 March 1877 – 4 April 1963) was an English recipient of the Victoria Cross, the highest and most prestigious award for gallantry in the face of the enemy that can be awarded to British and Commonwealth forces.

== Details ==
He was 41 years old, and a Private in the Royal Army Service Corps, British Army, attd. 141st Field Ambulance during the First World War when the following deed took place for which he was awarded the VC.

On 9 April 1918 near Bethune, France, owing to an enemy attack, communications were cut off and the wounded could not be evacuated. The road was reported impassable but Private Masters volunteered to try to get through and after great difficulty succeeded, although he had to clear the road of all sorts of debris. He made journey after journey throughout the afternoon over a road which was being shelled and swept by machine-gun fire and once he was bombed by an aeroplane. The greater number of wounded (approximately 200 men) were evacuated by him as his was the only car which got through.

After his death in 1963 at the age of 86, he was buried at St Cuthbert's parish church in Churchtown, Southport.

The Territorial Army and Volunteer Reserve (TAVR) Centre 30 Pelham Drive, Bootle, Liverpool is named after Private Masters, VC. It was built to house what is now 238 SQN 156 TPT RLC(V) – 238 Squadron of 156 Transport Regiment Royal Logistic Corps (Volunteers). The RLC, formerly the Royal Corps of Transport/RCT, includes the Field Ambulance units which trace their history back through the Royal Army Service Corps, the Army Service Corps and beyond. A troop of 96 Sqn RLC based at ATR Pirbright is also named after him.

In 1972, when the Royal Air Force's trials vessel No.5012 and former mineweeper HMS Halsham, was transferred to the Royal Corps of Transport to continue operations for Royal Aircraft Establishment, Farnborough, it was renamed Richard George Masters (later shortened to R G Masters), until withdrawn from service in 1979.

== The medal ==
His Victoria Cross is displayed at the New Royal Logistic Corps Museum RHQ The RLC, Building 204, Worthy Down Barracks, Winchester. SO21 2RG England). 2021 (signed KMB)

== Bibliography ==
- Gliddon, Gerald (2013) [2004]. Spring Offensive 1918. VCs of the First World War. The History Press. ISBN 978-0-7524-8730-4.
