= Southport Botanic Gardens =

Botanical garden in Churchtown, Southport, Merseyside, England

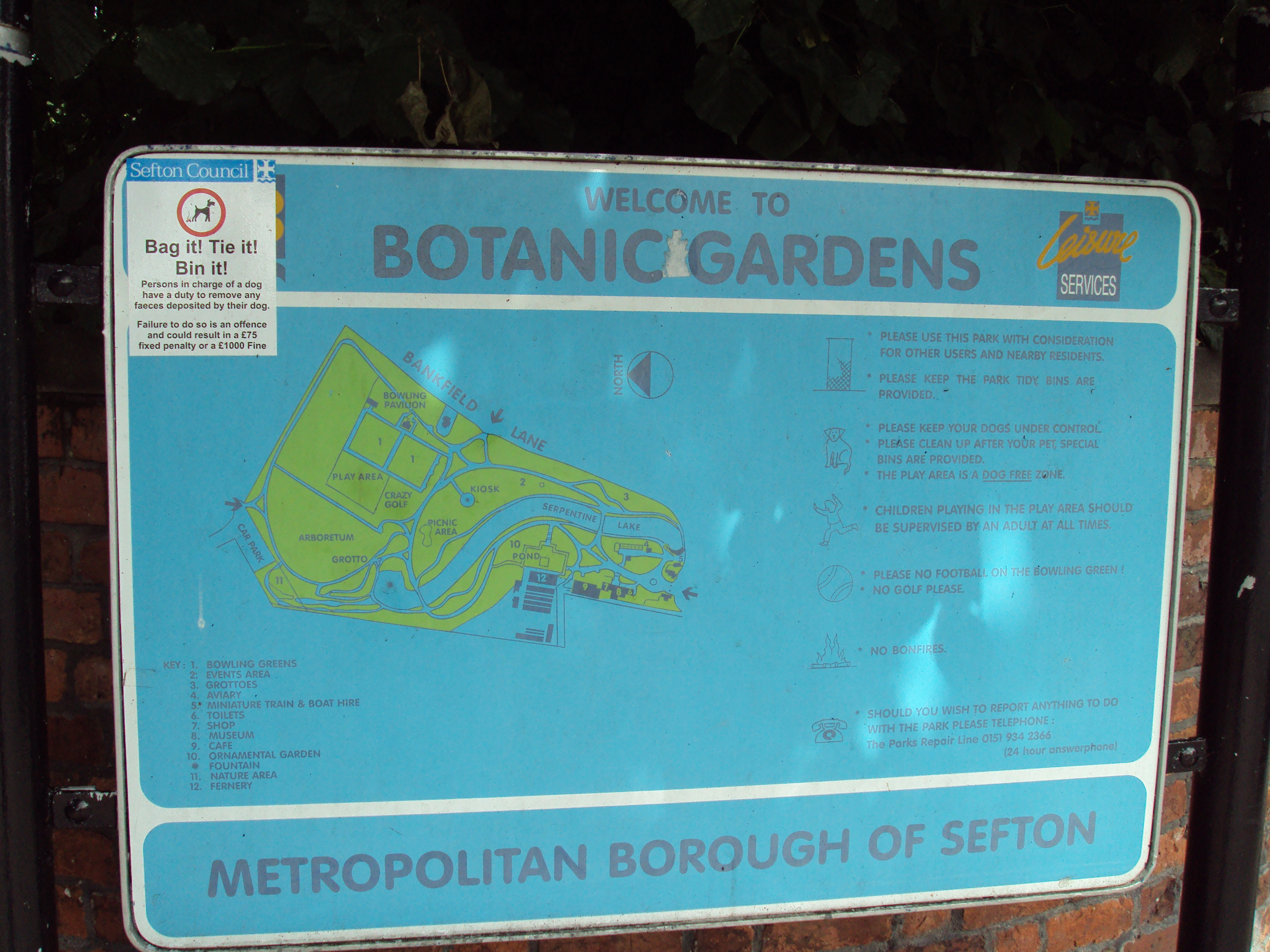
- Botanic Gardens welcome map on the Verulam Road entrance

- Location within Southport
- Type: Public park
- Location: Churchtown, Southport, England
- Coordinates: 53°39′43″N 2°57′33″W
- Created: 1874
- Operator: Sefton Council
- Status: Open all year round

Southport Botanic Gardens is a botanical garden situated in the suburban village of Churchtown, Southport, in Merseyside, England. It is often called "The Jewel in the Crown" as it is nationally known for its floral displays, which have been featured in the BBC TV program Gardener's World.

== History ==
The gardens were founded by a local group of working men, known as the Southport and Churchtown Botanic Gardens Company. The company acquired land from the Hesketh Estate (which belonged to Meols Hall) to establish the gardens. The company raised £18,000 to build the museum, a conservatory and tea rooms and to landscape the gardens.

The Botanic Gardens' lake was formed from part of a stream (known as Otter Pool) that flowed from Blowick through Meols Hall out to the Ribble Estuary. It is said that monks who lived nearby fished for eels in the stream. Until recently the flow of this stream had been intentionally blocked for 20–30 years at the point where it passed into the Gardens under Botanic Road, but this conduit was reopened in 2012. The gush of water out of the lake on re-opening sluiced away silt and mud in the stream bed, briefly exposing the cobbled ford which predated the road bridge.

The gardens were officially opened in 1875 by Rev. Charles Hesketh, from whom the land occupied by the gardens has been acquired. The ceremony included the laying of a foundation stone for the museum, which eventually opened in 1876.

Southport Botanic Gardens glasshouse, taken during the 1920s

The gardens closed in 1932, as plans had been drawn up for housing development, but were saved from being sold by the Southport Corporation. They reopened on 28 August 1937 as "The Botanic Gardens and King George Playing Fields". Today, the park's name has been reverted to Botanic Gardens.

== Conservatory ==
The gardens boasted a large glass conservatory with a fernery, which proved very popular with visitors, as it featured many tropical plants from around the world. Although the magnificent conservatory was eventually demolished, the fernery still remains. The site of the conservatory can still be seen in front of the fernery today, as the outline of the remains is laid out as a floral garden.

== Botanic Gardens Museum ==
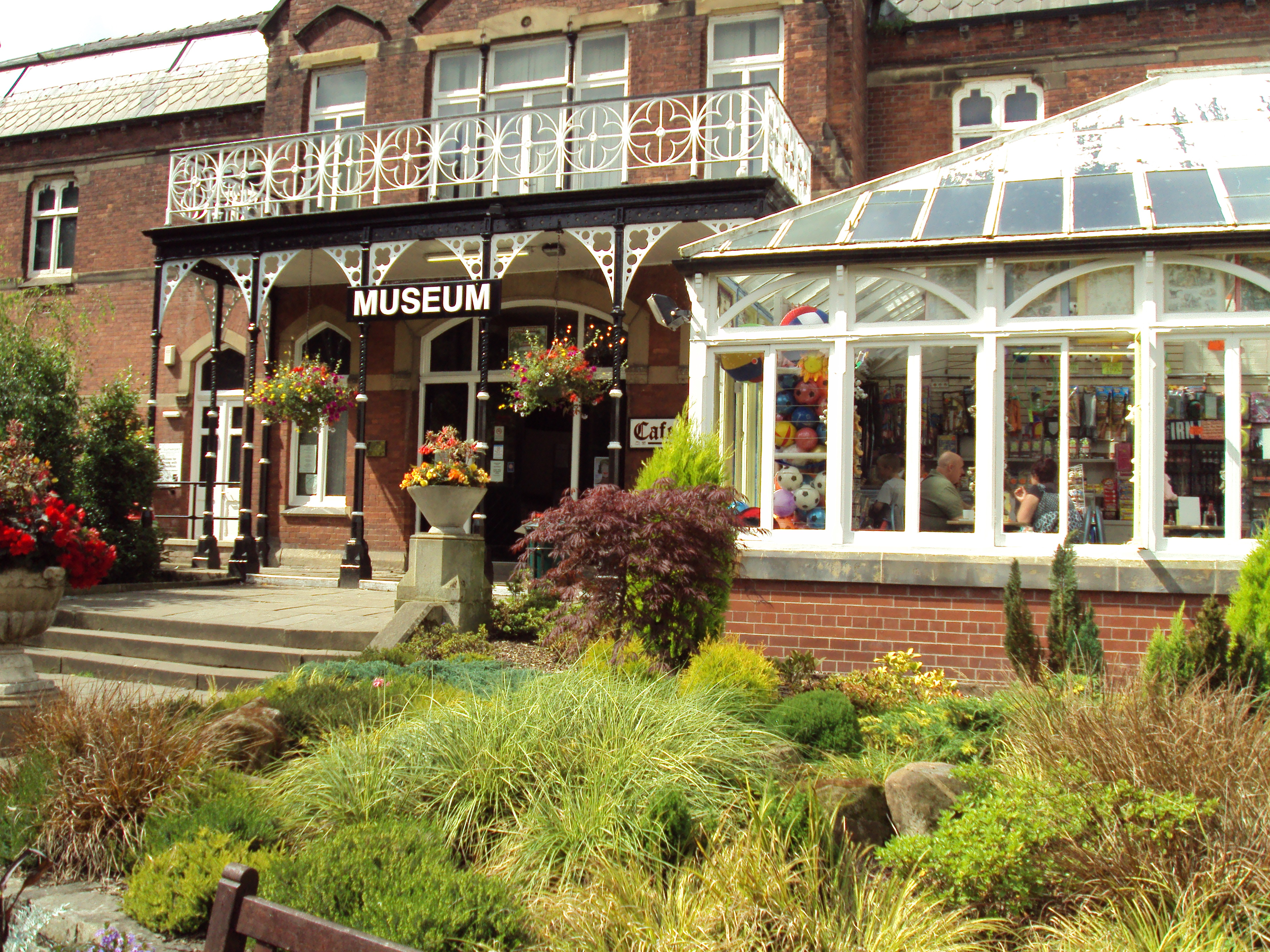
Botanic Gardens Museum

The Botanic Gardens Museum was opened in 1876. It was designed by the local architects Mellor & Sutton of London Street and built by George Duxfield of Duxfield Brothers, Southport.

The famous showman Phineas T. Barnum was an advisor in the construction of the museum, and his top hat was on display in the museum.

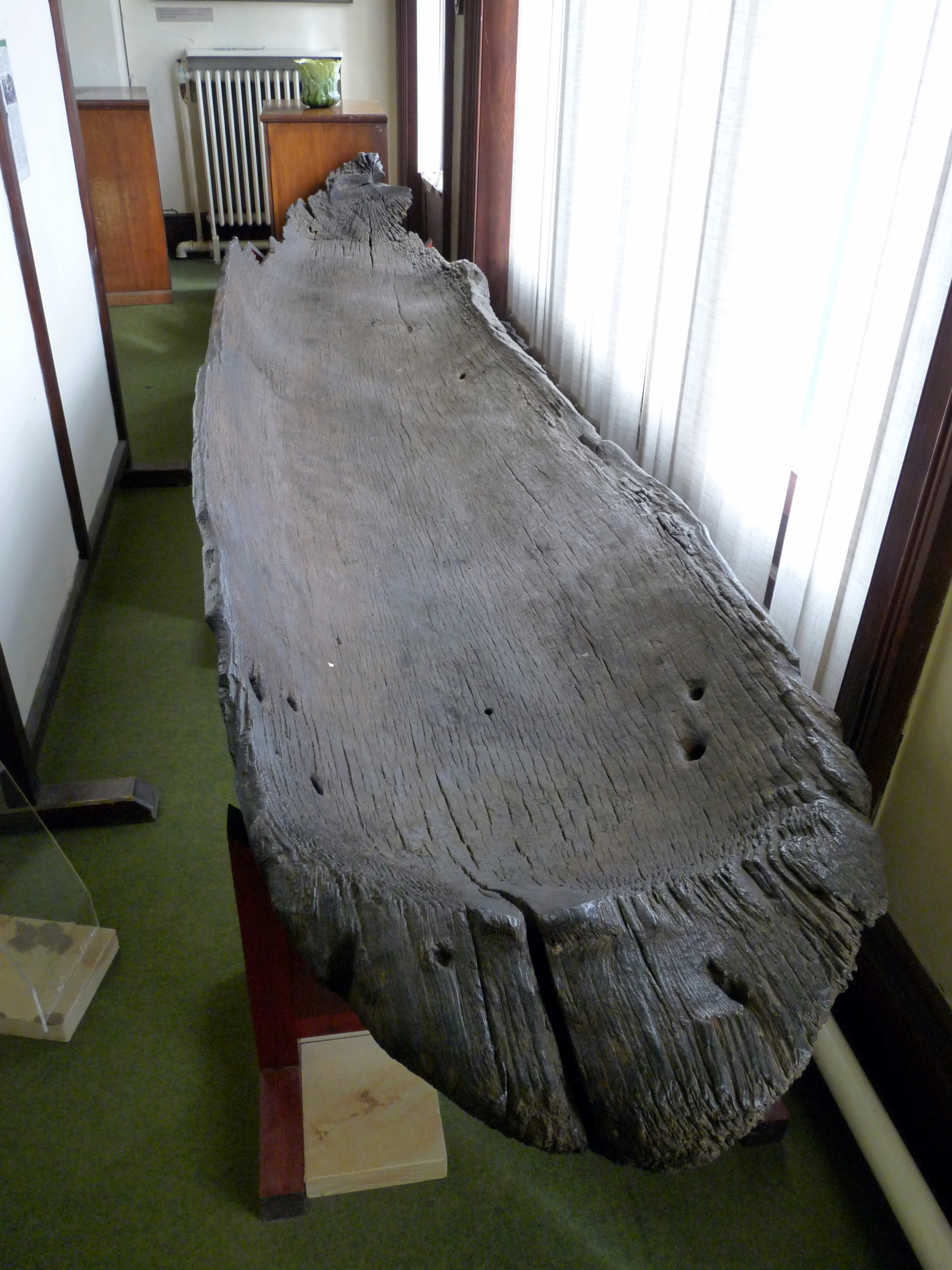
Martin Mere canoe

The running of the museum was funded by donations from the public and Sefton Council. It was the only local-history museum in Sefton.

=== New collection ===
When the gardens closed in 1932, all the collections were sold off. The museum was later reopened by John Scoles, who started from scratch a new collection.

The museum contained a number of fine collections—many of which have been donated by local residents—and its exhibits dealing with natural and local history include the Cecily Bate Collection of Dolls, a Victorian room and many local artefacts relating to Southport's heritage. One special item, and probably the oldest item in the museum was the ancient canoe which was found in Martin Mere.

=== Friends of the Botanic Gardens Museum ===
During the 1980s the Friends of the Botanic Gardens Museum organization was formed. They stopped the proposed closure of the museum at the time. The Friends had their own shop within the museum building.

=== Closure ===
The Botanic Gardens Museum was closed as part of a cost-cutting exercise by Sefton Council on 24 April 2011. The collections were transferred to the Atkinson Museum where many are currently on display, including the Martin Mere canoe and artefacts relating to the Mexico lifeboat disaster of 1886.

The Pennington taxidermy collection was transferred to the British Historical Taxidermy Society Trust (BHTST), based in Essex, in controversial circumstances. This was despite significant interest from National Museums Liverpool, who wanted to take on part of the collection and keep it in Merseyside. The collection has since been returned to Sefton Council and resides in the Atkinson Museum in Southport.

== 2012 Campaign ==
At the same time as the museum closed, horticultural activities at the gardens were significantly reduced. Sefton Council suggested further closures, which would see the loss of the Southport Botanic Gardens fernery, aviary, garden nursery and toilets, along with the conservatory at Hesketh Park. A group of local residents formed to save the remaining facilities at both parks, in particular at the botanic gardens, which had already lost the museum, boats on the lake, boat house, and road train that provided a ride around the park, as well as job losses of park gardeners. The flower beds are now maintained and entered into Britain in Bloom each year by the Botanic Gardens Community Association of volunteers who spend Mondays and Fridays every week of the year tending to as much of the park as they can. They have big hopes and dreams to return the gardens to their former splendour.

== See also ==
- Listed buildings in Churchtown, Merseyside
