= Constable Mausoleum =

Building in Halsham, East Riding of Yorkshire, England

Coordinates: 53°43′54″N 0°04′32″W

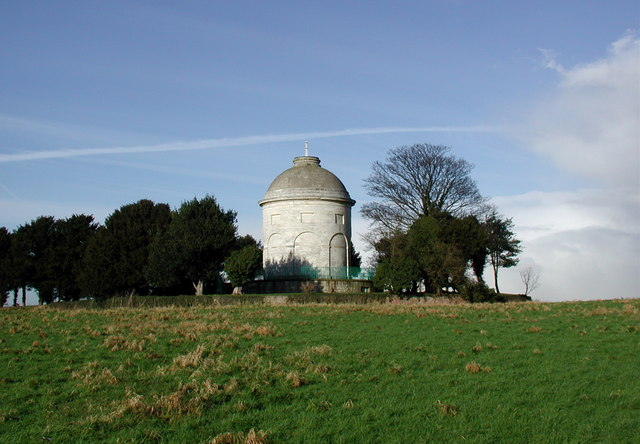
The building, in 2007

The Constable Mausoleum is a historic building in Halsham, a village in the East Riding of Yorkshire, in England.

The mausoleum was constructed for Edward Constable. It was designed by Thomas Atkinson, and constructed between 1792 and 1802, the work being completed by Atkinson's son, John. On completion, the bones of 27 of Constable's ancestors were transferred from All Saints' Church, Halsham. The mausoleum is approached by an avenue of yew trees. Around 1830, the base of the mausoleum was altered by William Mountain, and the building was restored around 1910. The building was grade II* listed in 1952.

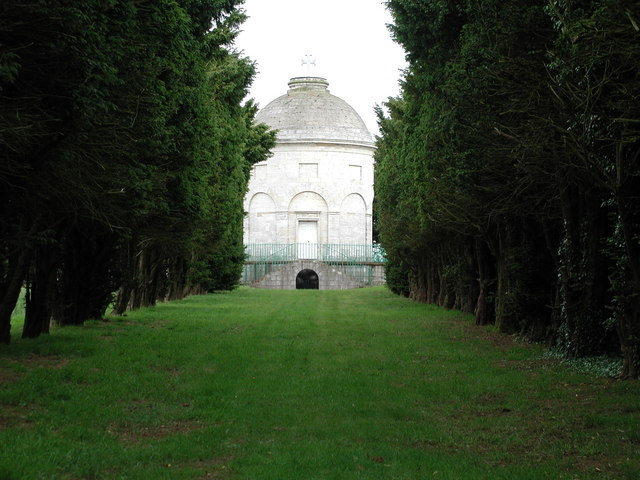
View along the yew avenue

The mausoleum is built of limestone and sandstone, and consists of a circular domed temple on a wider basement. The basement has a plinth and chamfered rustication, and contains a round-arched entrance under a perron leading up to a balcony with wrought iron railings. The temple has a moulded plinth, a blind arcade of eight round arches with pilasters, above which are recessed blind panels. Over this is a frieze, a moulded cornice, a blocking course, and a dome with a moulded cap and a cross finial. Inside, the main temple space have half-domed niches, and a frieze above has carved shields. The eastern niche has a crucifix. In the centre is a circular well with a tall pedestal holding a white urn. The basement has a vaulted circular corridor with tablets commemorating the individuals buried there.

== See also ==
- Grade II* listed buildings in the East Riding of Yorkshire
- Listed buildings in Halsham
