= Marshside, Merseyside =

Suburb of Southport, England

Coordinates: 53.66892°N 2.97318°W

Marshside
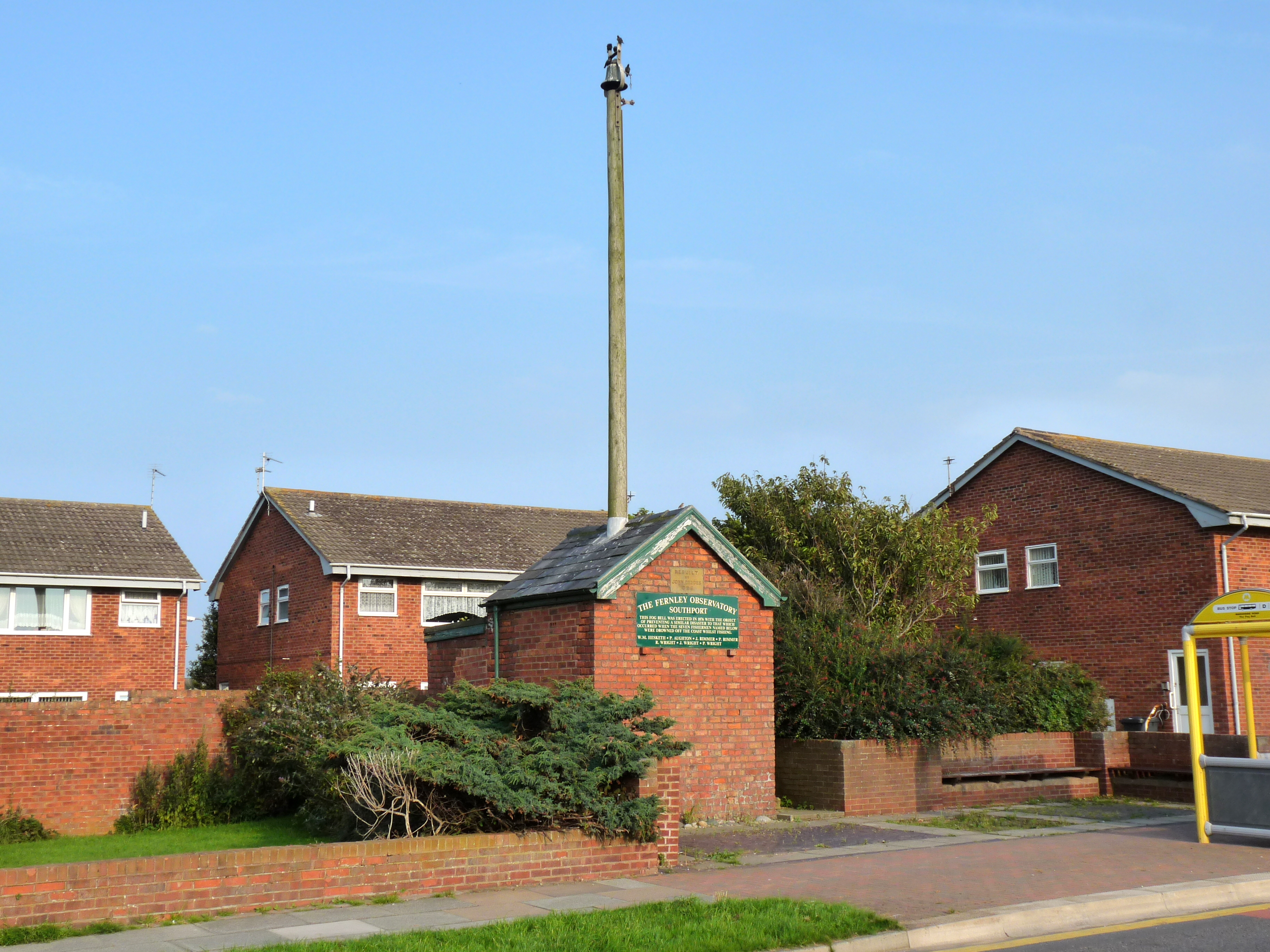
- The Fog Bell on Marshside Road

- Location in Southport Location within Merseyside
- OS grid reference: SD358193
- Metropolitan borough: Sefton
- Metropolitan county: Merseyside
- Region: North West
- Country: England
- Sovereign state: United Kingdom
- Post town: SOUTHPORT
- Postcode district: PR9
- Dialling code: 01704
- Police: Merseyside
- Fire: Merseyside
- Ambulance: North West
- UK Parliament: Southport

Marshside is a suburb of the town of Southport, Merseyside, England. It is part of the ancient parish of North Meols and was formerly a detached settlement, on the northern fringe of what is now Southport.

Marshside's most notable features are neighbours: the SSSI and nature reserve on the opposite side of Marine Drive. The sandwinning plant closed in early 2007. Whilst operational, it extracted thousands of tonnes of Southport sand per year for use in industry. The nature reserve is managed by the RSPB and provides food and accommodation to many native and migratory birds.

Marshside's traditional industry was shrimping, and the practice still continues to a diminished degree today.

Marshside has four schools: Marshside Primary School, St Patrick's Primary School, Larkfield Primary School (between Larkfield Lane and Preston New Road) and Stanley High School (on Fleetwood Road). The last of these is the largest, with around 800 pupils between the ages of 11 and 16.

Marshside was a local centre of the Temperance movement, and the Marshside Temperance Hall on Shellfield Road, built 1884 and rebuilt 1934, is a registered charity (Charity number: 233530), which continues to host community events, including the Tuesday Club which has been running for over 100 years. The hall is also used as a rehearsal space for the Marshside Brass Band, the only brass band in Southport.

Marshside has surprisingly few pubs (compared with neighbouring Churchtown), possibly in part due to the strong tradition of Methodism and Temperance in the former village. However, there is The Marsh Harrier (formerly named The Shrimper) on Fylde Road (next to The Co-operative Food mini-supermarket development). The Marsh Harrier is a food-serving pub and part of a large chain.

Immediately to the west of The Marsh Harrier pub, The Co-operative Food development also includes a general practice, The Corner Surgery, a fish and chips shop, Fylde Fish and Chips, and the Fylde Road Pharmacy.

Also on Fylde Road, further west towards the junction with Marshside Road, is the Fleetwood Hesketh Sports and Social Club. Built on land acquired from the Meols Hall estate in Churchtown, this private members club has various sports teams including football, cricket, crown green bowls and indoor bowls, darts, and snooker. It is nicknamed locally The Hut, as the original structure was adapted from former army huts.

St. Patrick's Parish Club on Marshside Road is another establishment licensed to serve alcohol. Situated at the back of the old church, the members club is open throughout the week.

In the early twentieth century, Marshside had its own completely unique dialect feature, involving a parasitic nasal consonant, occurring after certain final consonants, mostly plosives, in words at the end of a sense group, and before the plural inflexion [z] medially and at the end of a sense group.
