= Hesketh Park =

Hesketh Park may refer to:

- Hesketh Park, Southport, a public park in Southport, Merseyside, also used locally to describe the residential area near the park
- Hesketh Park railway station, a former railway station in Southport, Merseyside
- Hesketh Park (cricket ground), in Dartford, Kent
