= Listed buildings in Churchtown, Merseyside =

Churchtown is a district to the north of Southport, Sefton, Merseyside, England. It contains 84 buildings that are recorded in the National Heritage List for England as designated listed buildings. Of these, one is listed at Grade II*, the middle of the three grades, and the others are at Grade II, the lowest grade.

Churchtown existed as a settlement before Southport developed as a town and seaside resort from the later part of the 18th century. The houses were small and many of them had a single-depth plan (one room deep) and one storey. Most of the listed buildings in the district are survivors from this time and of this type. Other listed buildings are the country house Meols Hall and St Cuthbert's Church, together with structures associated with them. In the later 19th century Southport Botanic Gardens were established in the district, and these contain a number of listed buildings. Also included in the list are two public houses, an obelisk, and five lamp posts around the Green.

== Key ==
Grade	Criteria
II*	Particularly important buildings of more than special interest
II	Buildings of national importance and special interest

== Buildings ==
Name and location	Photograph	Date	Notes	Grade
2, 4 and 6 Back Botanic Road; 53.65838°N 2.96442°W	—	17th century	A row of four houses, cruck-framed with rendered brick cladding and thatched roofs. They are single-depth houses with eleven windows along the front, and are in a single storey excepting the right end of No. 2, which has two storeys. The windows are horizontally-sliding sashes.	II
1 and 3 Botanic Road; 53.65739°N 2.96602°W	—	17th century (probable)	Originally two houses, later one dwelling, in render on brick with a thatched roof. It has a single-depth plan, and is in one storey. On the front are five horizontally-sliding sash windows and a small gabled porch.	II
96 Botanic Road; 53.65956°N 2.96228°W	—	17th century (probable)	A house, formerly two houses, in two parts. The right part is in painted brick with a thatched roof, it has a single-depth plan, and is in a single storey. On the front is a doorway flanked by horizontally-sliding sash windows. The left part is in painted cobblestone and has a slate roof. It is in two storeys with a horizontally-sliding sash window in the ground floor and a casement window above.	II
Meols Hall; 53.65763°N 2.96087°W		17th century	A country house reduced in size in the 18th century, and rebuilt and extended in the 1960s by Roger Fleetwood-Hesketh reusing material from demolished country houses in Lancashire. It is built in brick with dressings in stone and cast stone, and has Westmorland slate roofs. The house is in two and three storeys, and consists of a main block with additions. The entrance front is relatively plain, with a single storey wing to the left containing a bow. The garden front is in Neoclassical style.	II*
West barn, Meols Hall; 53.65711°N 2.96199°W	—	Late 17th century (probable)	The former barn is in brick on a sandstone plinth with a roof of stone-slate and Welsh slates. It has two storeys, seven bays, and a continuous outshut on the east side. There are mullioned windows on the west and north fronts. The north front is gabled with an external staircase, and in the west front are a wagon doorway and ventilation slits.	II
Ball Monument; 53.66025°N 2.96182°W	—	1690s	The monument is a headstone to Jane Ball in the churchyard of St Cuthbert's Church. It is in sandstone and consists of a plain square slab with an inscription in Roman capitals.	II
14 Back Botanic Road; 53.65816°N 2.96395°W	—	Late 17th or early 18th century (probable)	Formerly two houses, later combined into one. It is in whitewashed brick with a thatched roof, it has a single-depth plan, and is in one storey. On the front are five horizontally-sliding sash windows and one fixed window.	II
187 and 189 Cambridge Road; 53.66001°N 2.96278°W	—	Late 17th or early 18th century (probable)	Two houses, consisting of a main range, and a later left wing. The main range is in rendered brick with a thatched roof, and has a single storey. The left wing is in brick with a slate roof, and has two storeys. The windows are a mix of horizontally-sliding sash windows, and casements.	II
9 Churchgate; 53.65807°N 2.96596°W	—	Late 17th or early 18th century (probable)	A brick house with a thatched roof, in a single-depth plan with an outshut at the rear. It has one storey, and contains horizontally-sliding sash windows.	II
2 Moss Lane; 53.65435°N 2.96505°W	—	Late 17th or early 18th century (probable)	A brick house, later extended, in two parts. The main range has a thatched roof, a single-depth plan, and is in one storey. To the left is a projecting extension with a slate roof. It has a 1 1/2-depth plan and is in two storeys. The windows are horizontally-sliding sashes.	II
22 St Cuthbert's Road; 53.66088°N 2.96340°W	—	Late 17th or early 18th century (probable)	A brick house with a thatched roof, in a single-depth plan and one storey. There is a small set-back wing at the left. On the front is a 20th-century flat-roofed porch. The windows are horizontally-sliding sashes.	II
Garden wall, Meols Hall; 53.65803°N 2.96033°W	—	Late 17th or early 18th century (probable)	The wall is attached to the northwest corner of the hall and extends along the west and north sides of the garden. It is constructed in brick, supported by buttresses, and includes an elliptical-arched bower near its west end.	II
Sally's Lane Cottages; 53.66043°N 2.96265°W	—	Late 17th or early 18th century (probable)	Originally probably a farmhouse, later two houses. They are in rendered brick with thatched roofs, and have a single-depth plan and one storey. The windows include horizontally-sliding sashes and a 20th-century bay window.	II
9 Botanic Road; 53.65769°N 2.96557°W	—	Early 18th century (probable)	A brick house with a slate roof in one storey. It has a 1 1/2-depth plan and a rear outshut. The house has a square-headed doorway and two segmental-headed casement windows.	II
11 and 13 Botanic Road; 53.65784°N 2.96518°W	—	Early 18th century (probable)	Originally a farmhouse and stable, later two houses. They are in brick with a thatched roof, and are in a single-depth plan. The houses have one storey, and there is an attic to No. 13. On the front are two doorways, two horizontally-sliding sash windows, two casement windows, and one fixed window.	II
50, 52, 54 and 54A Botanic Road; 53.65891°N 2.96393°W	—	Early 18th century (probable)	A row of three houses, the outer ones converted into shops. They are in brick, partly rendered, with a thatched roof. The buildings have a single-depth plan, and are in one storey with an attic. The left shop has a rectangular window and a horizontally-sliding sash window, the shop on the right has two bow windows, and the central house has a horizontally-sliding sash in the ground floor and a casement window in a thatched eyebrow above.	II
40 St Cuthbert's Road; 53.65991°N 2.96254°W	—	Early 18th century (probable)	A brick house with a thatched roof on two levels, in two unequal bays. The left bay is in two storeys with a doorway and a horizontally-sliding sash window on the front. The right bay has one storey and a casement window. There are more horizontally-sliding sash windows on the other fronts.	II
Churchyard wall 53.66006°N 2.96202°W	—	Early 18th century (probable)	The wall is on the west and south sides of the churchyard of St Cuthbert's Church. It is mainly in brick, with some incorporated boulders, and has a sandstone coping.	II
St Cuthbert's Church; 53.66031°N 2.96208°W		1730–39	Alterations were made to the church in about 1860, and it was further restored by Isaac Taylor in 1909, including rebuilding the chancel. The church is built in sandstone with a slate roof, and consists of a nave and a chancel with a west steeple. The steeple has a three-stage tower with a west doorway and a clock face on the south side. On the top is a pilastered parapet and a recessed octagonal spire.	II
Gate piers, Parish Hall; 53.65992°N 2.96185°W	—	c. 1730–40 (probable)	A pair of gate piers, originally at the entrance to the churchyard of St Cuthbert's Church, and moved to this site in 1935. They are in sandstone with a square plan and moulded bases. At the top are moulded cornices surmounted by gadrooned flaming urn finials.	II
17–23 Botanic Road; 53.65806°N 2.96504°W	—	Early to mid 18th century (probable)	A row of four, later three, houses in brick with Nos. 21 and 23 rendered. They have slate roofs and are in two storeys. The original windows were horizontally-sliding sashes; some of these remain, others have been replaced by casements and a bow window.	II
Meadow Headstone; 53.66023°N 2.96202°W	—	c. 1737–40	A memorial to members of the Meadow family in the churchyard of St Cuthbert's Church. It consists of an inscribed sandstone headstone and grave slab.	II
24 and 24A Manor Road; 53.65944°N 2.96553°W	—	1741	Originally one house, later extended and divided into two. It is roughcast with a slate roof, and has a double-depth plan with two storeys. Above the doorway is a date stone. All the original windows have been replaced.	II
Stocks; 53.66011°N 2.96234°W	—	1741	The remains of the stocks consist of a pair of sandstone posts with round tops and slots in the inner sides. Between the posts are two low slabs hollowed for two pairs of legs.	II
88, 90 and 92 Botanic Road; 53.65950°N 2.96253°W	—	18th century (probable)	Two shops, formerly three, in painted brick with a slate roof. They have a single-depth plan, and are in 1 1/2 and two storeys. They contain doorways and various shop windows. Above are a horizontally-sliding sash window and a small attic window.	II
100 and 102 Botanic Road; 53.65952°N 2.96186°W	—	18th century	Two houses. No. 102 is in brick with a slate roof, it has a double-pile plan and is in two storeys. There is a central doorway and two sash windows on each floor. No. 100 is smaller and lower, and is in whitewashed brick with a stone-slate roof. On the front is a doorway and a horizontally-sliding sash window.	II
6, 8 and 10 Mill Lane; 53.65488°N 2.96518°W	—	18th century (probable)	A row of three rendered houses with slate roofs. They have a single-depth plan, and are in one and two storeys. No. 6 has a lean-to porch and extension; the other houses have square-headed doorways. The windows are a mix of horizontally-sliding sashes and casements.	II
16 Mill Lane; 53.65529°N 2.96529°W	—	18th century (probable)	A rendered house with a tiled roof, extended at the rear. It has a single-depth plan and is in one storey. On the front facing the road are two 20th-century casement windows.	II
Bold Arms Hotel; 53.65960°N 2.96286°W		18th century (probable)	A rendered public house with a slate roof in four blocks at different levels. The main block has a double-depth plan and is in two storeys, as are the blocks on each side, with a single storey extension to the right. In the main block are two doorways with fluted pilasters and canopies, and two bay windows. There are two French windows, and the other windows are sashes. In front of the bay windows are wooden railings for tethering horses; these are included in the listing.	II
Gate piers and wall, Meols Hall Farmyard; 53.65730°N 2.96174°W	—	18th century	The wall forms the north boundary to the farmyard and contains two gate piers. The wall is in brick with a concrete coping. The square piers are in Classical style, in sandstone, each with a moulded plinth and cornice, and a swept top with a moulded square cap.	II
Ha-ha and gazebos, Meols Hall; 53.65740°N 2.96019°W	—	18th century	The ha-ha is built in blocks of dressed sandstone with coped tops. It is about 100m long, and at each end is a gazebo built in the 20th century in the style of the 18th century.	II
Obelisk; 53.65982°N 2.96220°W	—	18th century	The obelisk was moved to its present site from Worden Hall, Leyland, Lancashire, in 1950. It is in gritstone blocks, square in section, and stands on a pedestal with the worn inscription: "rebuilt in commemoration of the glorious events of 1811" (referencing the Great_Comet_of_1811). On the top is a bronze sunburst finial representing the comet.	II
34 and 36 Manor Road; 53.65879°N 2.96524°W	—	Mid to late 18th century (probable)	A house later divided into flats, rendered with a composition tiled roof. It has a double-depth plan, is in two storeys with an attic, and has a lean-to on the left side with a stone-slate roof. The doorway has a fanlight and a hood mould. Most of the windows are sashes.	II
Hesketh Arms Hotel; 53.65979°N 2.96171°W		Mid to late 18th century (probable)	A public house, rendered on brick, with slate roofs. It has an irregular plan, is in two storeys, and has fronts facing west and south, with an extension at the rear. On the west front is a three-bay porch with Doric columns, and on the south front is a bow window. The other windows are sashes.	II
55 Botanic Road; 53.65934°N 2.96327°W	—	Late 18th century (probable)	A house, rendered on brick, with a slate roof. It has a single-depth plan and two storeys. There is a central doorway and has two windows in each floor, all of which have been altered.	II
68 and 70 Botanic Road; 53.65920°N 2.96322°W	—	Late 18th century (probable)	A pair of brick houses with a slate roof, the left house converted into a shop. They have a double-depth plan, and are in two storeys. In the ground floor is a shop front on the left, and a doorway and a sash window with a wedge lintel on the right. In the upper floor are more sash windows.	II
3 and 5 Churchgate; 53.65818°N 2.96549°W	—	Late 18th century (probable)	A pair of houses in whitewashed brick with slate roofs. They have a long linear single-depth plan, and are in one storey. Each house has a doorway and three windows, all horizontally-sliding sashes except for one casement window.	II
4–14 Churchgate; 53.65837°N 2.96593°W	—	Late 18th century (probable)	A row of six brick houses, some stuccoed, and some roughcast, with slate roofs. They have a liner double-depth plan and are in two storeys. Each has a doorway and, in each storey, one window. Most of the windows are horizontally-sliding sashes, the others are replacement casements.	II
7 Churchgate; 53.65817°N 2.96578°W	—	Late 18th century (probable)	A house, roughcast on brick, with a slate roof. It is in a single storey, and has a lean-to porch. The windows include two horizontally-sliding sashes, and one casement.	II
2 Mill Lane; 53.65450°N 2.96508°W	—	Late 18th century (probable)	A house in rendered brick with a slate roof. It has a 1 1/2-depth plan, and is in two storeys with a lean-to extension on the right. On the front is a square-headed doorway with a casement window in each floor and another in the extension.	II
20, 22 and 24 Mill Lane; 53.65550°N 2.96536°W	—	Late 18th century (probable)	A row of three brick houses, partly rendered, with slate roofs. They have a single-depth plan, are in one storey, and each house has three windows. On the front is one lean-to porch and two doorways, and the windows are in various styles.	II
26 and 28 Mill Lane; 53.65573°N 2.96544°W	—	Late 18th century (probable)	A pair of rendered brick houses with slate roofs. They have a single-depth plan, and are in one storey. On the front are two doorways, three horizontally-sliding sash windows, and two casements.	II
4 and 6 Moss Lane; 53.65449°N 2.96470°W	—	Late 18th century (probable)	A pair of brick houses, one rendered, with slate roofs. It has a 1 1/2-depth plan and is in two storeys, with a single-storey extension on the right. On the front is an added gabled porch, and the windows are later casements.	II
Cart shed, Meols Hall; 53.65698°N 2.96168°W	—	Late 18th century (probable)	The cart shed is on the south side of the farmyard, and is in brick with a slate roof. It has a long rectangular plan, is in seven bays, and has brick piers.	II
Sutton Monument; 53.66020°N 2.96207°W	—	c. 1780–1820	The monument is in the churchyard of St Cuthbert's Church and commemorates members of the Sutton family. It is in sandstone and consists of a slab with a panel containing the skull and crossbones, and inscriptions.	II
12 Botanic Road; 53.65752°N 2.96506°W	—	Late 18th or early 19th century (probable)	A stuccoed house with a slate roof in a single storey. It has a single-depth plan with a parallel range added to the rear. On the front is a doorway and three sash windows.	II
57 Botanic Road; 53.65939°N 2.96315°W	—	Late 18th or early 19th century (probable)	A rendered house with a slate roof in two storeys. It has an L-shaped plan and an almost symmetrical front. The central doorway is flanked by sash windows, and in the upper floor the windows have been altered.	II
98 Botanic Road; 53.65958°N 2.96213°W	—	Late 18th or early 19th century (probable)	A house, later a shop, in brick with a slate roof. It has a double-depth plan and is in two storeys. In the ground floor are a doorway and a shop window, and above is a casement window.	II
2, 3 and 4 Chase Heys; 53.65915°N 2.96938°W	—	Late 18th or early 19th century (probable)	A row of three, originally four, houses in rendered brick with slate roofs at different levels. They have an irregular single-depth plan, and are in one storey. On the front are seven windows, some are horizontally-sliding sashes, others are bow windows, and there is one casement window.	II
2 Churchgate; 53.65847°N 2.96561°W	—	Late 18th or early 19th century (probable)	A rendered house with a slate roof. It has double-depth plan, and is in two storeys and three bays, the left bay being slightly higher. On the front is a 20th-century porch, and all the windows are 20th-century casements.	II
14 Mill Lane; 53.65517°N 2.96526°W	—	Late 18th or early 19th century (probable)	A rendered house with a slate roof, in a 1 1/2-depth plan and a single storey. It has been extended at the rear, the entrance front. On the front facing the road are two windows, a horizontally-sliding sash and a slightly bowed casement.	II
1 Churchgate; 53.65833°N 2.96520°W	—	c. 1800 (probable)	A house converted into a shop, in painted brick with a slate roof. It has a rectangular plan, and is in one storey with gabled ends. On the main front is a doorway and a window, there is a bow window on the east front, and a casement window on the west front.	II
5, 6 and 7 Chase Heys, 88 and 90 Beresford Drive; 53.65929°N 2.96968°W	—	c. 1800–10	A block of brick houses, two are rendered and two are painted, with slate roofs. All originally had a single-depth plan and have been extended. Most are in two storeys, and they have a variety of windows.	II
53 Botanic Road; 53.65932°N 2.96339°W	—	1806	A house, later a shop, and then a house again. It is in brick with a slate roof, and has two storeys. The doorway is round-headed and has an architrave with an open pediment and a fanlight. To the left is an inserted shop window and doorway. The other windows are sashes with wedge lintels, and between the upper windows is a quatrefoil date stone.	II
86 and 86A Beresford Drive; 53.65926°N 2.96987°W	—	1807	A pair of houses in rendered brick with slate roofs. They are in a single storey with later attics and have a double-depth plan. On the front are two doorways, various windows, two gabled dormers, and an extension to the left.	II
10 Back Botanic Road; 53.65844°N 2.96335°W	—	Early 19th century (probable)	A house in whitewashed brick with a slate roof. It is single-depth, and in one storey. On the front are two horizontally-sliding sash windows and a 20th-century porch, and there is an extension to the rear.	II
14, 16 and 18 Botanic Road; 53.65771°N 2.96495°W		Early 19th century (probable)	A row of three brick houses, two of them converted into shops, with slate roofs. They have a double-depth plan and are in two storeys. Nos. 16 and 18 have shop fronts in the ground floor; No. 14 has a doorway with a fanlight flanked by two sash windows, and there are more sashes in the upper floor. The doorway and windows have wedge lintels.	II
27 Botanic Road and Smithy; 53.65825°N 2.96502°W	—	Early 19th century (probable)	A house and attached smithy in brick with slate roofs. The house has two storeys, a doorway, and a sash window in each floor. The smithy is in a single storey with an offshut on the left containing a window, and the main part recessed with a doorway and a window.	II
32 and 34 Botanic Road; 53.65834°N 2.96468°W	—	Early 19th century (probable)	A pair of houses converted into shops, roughcast with slate roofs. They are symmetrical with a double-depth plan and have two storeys. In the ground floor are wooden pilastered shop fronts, each with a frieze and a cornice and containing doorways and a shop window. In the upper floor are horizontally-sliding sash windows.	II
Church Cottage; 53.66039°N 2.96242°W	—	Early 19th century (probable)	A house, roughcast on brick, with a slate roof. It has a single storey and a two-bay front, with later additions and extensions at the rear. On the front is a gabled porch flanked by sash windows. In front of the house is a sandstone garden wall with brick coping; this is included in the listing.	II
East barn, Meols Hall; 53.65715°N 2.96143°W	—	Early 19th century (probable)	The former barn is in brick with a slate roof, and has a rectangular plan. It contains doorways, a fixed window, ventilation holes in X-patterns, and a circular pitch hole.	II
Gates and gate piers, Meols Hall; 53.65942°N 2.96165°W		Early 19th century	The gates and gate piers were moved from the South Lodge of Bold Hall probably in the 1950s. The square piers are in rusticated sandstone with moulded cornices and shallow flat tops. The gates are in wrought iron and form a pair of carriage gates flanked by pedestrian gates carried on openwork standards.	II
Stable and coach house, Bold Arms Hotel; 53.65960°N 2.96336°W	—	Early 19th century (probable)	The former stable and coach house, later used for storage, are in rendered brick with sandstone dressings and a slate roof. The building has a long linear plan, it is in a single storey with attics, and has seven bays. In the sixth bay is an external staircase. The other bays have round-headed arches forming an arcade, above which are round pitch holes.	II
Conservative Club; 53.66011°N 2.96249°W		1826	Originating as a National School and extended in 1837, it has been later used as a club. The building is roughcast with sandstone dressings and a slate roof. It has a rectangular plan and is in a single storey. The original doorways have been blocked but their lintels, with inscribed panels above, survive. The windows have three lights with wooden mullions.	II
72–86 Botanic Road; 53.65938°N 2.96283°W	—	Early to mid 19th century	A row of eight brick houses converted into shops, one rendered, with slate roofs. They have a double-depth plan, and are in two storeys. In the ground floor are various shop fronts, one with a bow window, and in the floor above most of the windows are sashes, some having been altered.	II
29, 31 and 31A Botanic Road; 53.65852°N 2.96500°W	—	1841	Two houses with a shop to the left, in brick, the shop being rendered; the roofs are in slate. The shop is in one storey with a doorway and a long six-pane window. The houses are in two storeys, No. 31 has three bays and No. 31A has two. The windows are sashes.	II
5 Botanic Road; 53.65742°N 2.96586°W	—	19th century (probable)	A house, roughcast on brick, with a slate roof. It has a double-depth plan and is in a single storey. On the front is a gabled porch, with a bay window to the left and a casement window to the right.	II
56–62 Botanic Road; 53.65903°N 2.96361°W	—	Mid 19th century (probable)	A row of four houses, the left house converted into a shop. They are in brick with slate roofs, have a double-depth plan, and two storeys. On the ground floor, the shop has an inserted shop front, and to the right are two segmental-headed doorways. The windows are horizontally-sliding sash windows.	II
East gates and gate piers, Botanic Gardens; 53.66166°N 2.95773°W	—	c. 1876 (probable)	The gates and gate piers are at the east entrance to the gardens. They are in wrought iron, and consist of a central carriage gate and flanking pedestrian gates. The piers are square with pyramidal caps and poppy-seed finials, and the gates have fleur-de-lis finials.	II
Main gates and gate posts, Botanic Gardens; 53.65996°N 2.95997°W		c. 1876 (probable)	The gates and gate posts are at the main entrance to the gardens; the posts are in cast iron and the gates in wrought iron. There are six octagonal posts, forming a central carriageway and two pedestrian gateways of unequal width. The carriage gates are missing.	II
Fern house, Botanic Gardens; 53.66112°N 2.95983°W		c. 1876 (probable)	The fernery is in brick and has a whitewashed glass roof. It has a long rectangular plan and is in a single storey. Inside the walls are lined with pumice stone shaped to form grottoes, pools, and rocks.	II
Lock-up; Botanic Gardens; 53.65984°N 2.95953°W	—	c. 1876 (probable)	The former lock-up, later used as a store, is in red brick with dressings in blue brick and sandstone. and with a polygonal slate roof and finials. It is in a single storey with canted ends, and contains a doorway and two false windows.	II
Number 1 Lodge, Botanic Gardens; 53.65996°N 2.96010°W		1876	The lodge at the west side of the main entrance is in brick with sandstone dressings and a slate roof and is in Neo-Jacobean style. It has a T-shaped plan and is in two storeys. The Botanical Road façade is gabled with a finial; this façade and the one facing the drive each contains a bay window.	II
Number 2 Lodge, Botanic Gardens; 53.65996°N 2.95979°W	—	1876	The lodge at the east side of the main entrance is in brick with sandstone dressings and a slate roof and is in Neo-Jacobean style. It has a T-shaped plan and is in two storeys. The Botanical Road façade is gabled with a finial; this façade and the one facing the drive each contains a bay window.	II
Museum, Botanic Gardens; 53.66046°N 2.96000°W		1876	The museum by Mellor and Sutton is in brick with sandstone dressings. It has a cruciform plan, and is in two storeys with an attic. The longer side wings have slate Mansard roofs with a glazed clerestories, and the central wing, containing the entrance, has a pitched slate roof. On the right side of the front is a cast iron verandah surmounted by a balcony.	II
North bridge, Botanic Gardens; 53.66222°N 2.96016°W	—	c. 1876 (probable)	A footbridge crossing the northern part of the Serpentine Lake. It is carried on three brick piers, and has cast iron beams, posts and an ornamental balustrade. The deck is wooden.	II
South bridge, Botanic Gardens; 53.66064°N 2.95909°W		c. 1876 (probable)	A footbridge crossing the southern part of the Serpentine Lake. It is carried on three brick piers, and has cast iron beams, posts and an ornamental balustrade. The deck is wooden.	II
Lamp post, 92 Botanic Road; 53.65956°N 2.96247°W	—	Late 19th to early 20th century (probable)	A cast iron lamp post. It consists of a pedestal, square at the bottom and octagonal at the top, an octagonal shaft, and four curved brackets holding a lantern with a finial.	II
Lamp post, 96 and 98 Botanic Road; 53.65960°N 2.96226°W	—	Late 19th to early 20th century (probable)	A cast iron lamp post. It consists of a pedestal, square at the bottom and octagonal at the top, an octagonal shaft, and four curved brackets holding a lantern with a finial.	II
Lamp post, Botanic Road junction 53.65969°N 2.96257°W	—	Late 19th to early 20th century (probable)	A cast iron lamp post. It consists of a pedestal, square at the bottom and octagonal at the top, an octagonal shaft, and four curved brackets holding a lantern with a finial.	II
Lamp post, East corner of Green; 53.65975°N 2.96208°W	—	Late 19th to early 20th century (probable)	A cast iron lamp post. It consists of a pedestal, square at the bottom and octagonal at the top, an octagonal shaft, and four curved brackets holding a lantern with a finial.	II
Lamp post, West corner of Green; 53.65980°N 2.96234°W	—	Late 19th to early 20th century (probable)	A cast iron lamp post. It consists of a pedestal, square at the bottom and octagonal at the top, an octagonal shaft, and four curved brackets holding a lantern with a finial.	II
Shippon, Meols Hall; 53.65705°N 2.96246°W	—	1951	The shippon was designed by Roger Fleetwood-Hesketh in Palladian style. It is in brick with stone dressings and a stone-slate roof. The building has an E-shaped plan, and consists of a central two-storey block flanked by four-bay wings ending in single-storey pavilions. In the central block is a cart entrance, the wings have a loggia on the east front, and there are more cart entrances in the pavilions.	II
