= Halsham =

Village and civil parish in the East Riding of Yorkshire, England

Coordinates: 53°43′36″N 0°04′20″W

- Location within the East Riding of Yorkshire
- Population: 255 (2011 census)
- OS grid reference: TA273270
  - London: 155 mi (249 km) S
- Civil parish: Halsham
- Unitary authority: East Riding of Yorkshire
- Ceremonial county: East Riding of Yorkshire
- Region: Yorkshire and the Humber
- Country: England
- Sovereign state: United Kingdom
- Post town: HULL
- Postcode district: HU12
- Dialling code: 01964
- Police: Humberside
- Fire: Humberside
- Ambulance: Yorkshire
- UK Parliament: Beverley and Holderness

Halsham is a village and civil parish in the East Riding of Yorkshire, England, in an area known as Holderness. It is situated approximately 4 miles (6.4 km) west of Withernsea town centre and it lies south of the B1362 road.

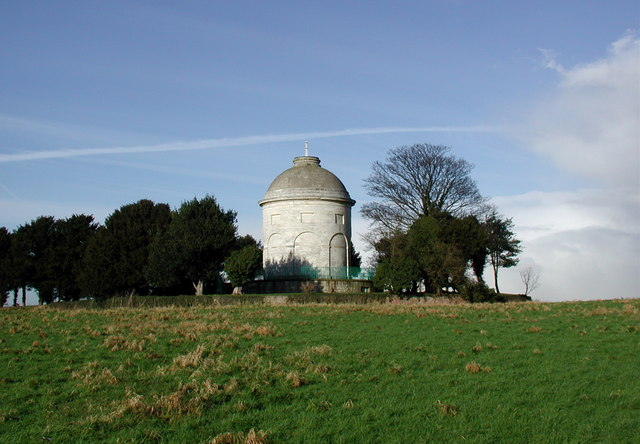
Mausoleum of the Constable family, near Halsham

According to the 2011 UK census, Halsham parish had a population of 255, a decrease on the 2001 UK census figure of 260.

The name Halsham derives from the Old English halshām meaning 'village on a neck of land'.

The Anglican All Saints' Church, Halsham was designated a Grade I listed building in 1966 and is now recorded in the National Heritage List for England, maintained by Historic England. To the east of the church is the Constable Mausoleum which is designated as a Grade II* listed building. Halsham House, a former school, dates to the late 16th century.

HMS Halsham, a Ham class of inshore minesweeper, was named after the village.

In 1823 inhabitants in the village numbered 315. Occupations included sixteen farmers, three wheelwrights, a bricklayer, a grocer, a blacksmith, and the landlord of the Sun public house. A carrier operated between the village and Hull on Tuesdays. The village was described as consisting of "chiefly a number of respectable farm houses, scattered at irregular distances from each other". The Constable family mausoleum is described as of stone, with polished white marble facing, with, at its centre, a monument to Sir William Constable (Historic England credits it to Sir Edward; Pevsner to Sir William), built at a cost of £10,000. Sir John Constable of Kirby Knowle in 1584 left 80/- (shillings) per year from his estate to be paid out in perpetuity: 20/- for the education of eight poor children with a further 24/- for their satchels and books; 32/- for eight poor men; and 4/- for two poor women. He provided for a hospital for the use of the poor men and women of the parish.

== See also ==
- Listed buildings in Halsham
