= Halsham House =

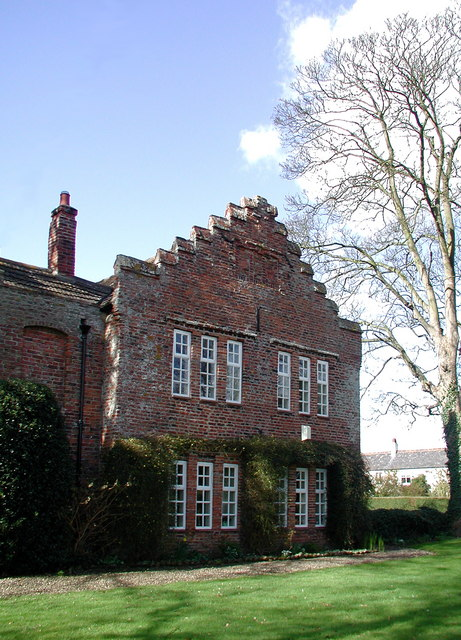
- Halsham House

- Location within East Riding of Yorkshire

General information
- Status: Private residence
- Type: House / former school
- Architectural style: Late 16th century
- Location: B1362, Halsham, East Riding of Yorkshire, Halsham, England
- Coordinates: 53°43′53″N 0°4′40″W
- Construction started: c. 1579
- Completed: c. 1584

Technical details
- Material: Red brick, timber-framing, brick infill, concrete tile roof
- Floor count: 2 + attic

Halsham House is a historic building in the village of Halsham, East Riding of Yorkshire, England. It is a Grade II listed building originally established as a school and schoolhouse in the late 16th century and later converted into a private residence.

== History ==
The building was established as a school and schoolhouse following the will of Sir John Constable, who died in 1579. The incorporation of the school took place in 1584 for the education of eight boys. In the 18th and 19th centuries, the schoolroom was located on the upper floor, while the master occupied the remaining rooms. From 1871 until its closure around 1960, the building was wholly used as a school.

The building is now a private residence.

The house was featured in Season 18, Episode 3 of the paranormal investigative series Most Haunted, which aired on 14 July 2016, alleging it to be haunted by the ghost of a child.

== Architecture ==
Halsham House was originally constructed circa 1579–1584. It is L-shaped, with a main range of six internal bays, two storeys, and an attic. The building is primarily built of red brick in English bond, with timber-framed internal walls and brick infill. The roof is covered in concrete tiles.

The east front has two bays with tripartite ground-floor windows and crow-stepped gables with saddle-back coping and moulded kneelers. The interior contains features such as a porch with a four-centred arch entrance, oak doors with wrought-iron strap hinges, a basket-arched inglenook fireplace, and heavy oak ceiling beams.

Alterations have been made over time, including partial rebuilding of the porch in 1884 and renovations around 1971, such as refenestration of the east front, removal of an external stack, and rebuilding of a north-east wall.

== See also ==
- Listed buildings in Halsham
