= Listed buildings in Halsham =

Halsham is a civil parish in the county of the East Riding of Yorkshire, England. It contains three listed buildings that are recorded in the National Heritage List for England. Of these, one is listed at Grade I, the highest of the three grades, one is at Grade II*, the middle grade, and the other is at Grade II, the lowest grade. The parish contains the village of Halsham and the surrounding area. All the listed buildings are at the West End of the village, and consist of a church, a school, later a private house, and a mausoleum.

== Key ==
Grade	Criteria
I	Buildings of exceptional interest, sometimes considered to be internationally important
II*	Particularly important buildings of more than special interest
II	Buildings of national importance and special interest

== Buildings ==
Name and location	Photograph	Date	Notes	Grade
All Saints' Church; 53.73070°N 0.079340°W		Early 12th century	The church has been altered and extended through the centuries, including a restoration in 1869–70 by Ewan Christian. It is built in cobble, limestone and brick, and has a slate roof, with lead on the north chapel. The church consists of a nave, north and south aisles, a chancel with a north chapel, and a west tower. The tower has three stages, a moulded plinth, angle and diagonal buttresses, slit windows, moulded string courses, and a three-light west window with a hood mould, above which is an ogee-headed niche with an angel corbel. The middle stage has a small square window on the south, the bell openings have two lights with pointed heads, and above is a gargoyle, and a coped embattled parapet.	I
Halsham House; 53.73110°N 0.07741°W		1579–84	Originally a grammar school, almshouses and master's lodging, later a private house, it has a timber framed core, red brick walls, and a tile roof with crow-stepped east gable. There are two storeys and attics, an L-shaped plan, and ten bays. At the east end of the south front is a two-storey embattled porch with an oculus. Most of the windows are 20th-century tripartite replacements, and there are some sash windows. Inside, there is an inglenook fireplace.	II
Constable Mausoleum; 53.73175°N 0.07550°W		1792–1802	The mausoleum was designed by Thomas Atkinson. It is in limestone and sandstone, and consists of a circular domed temple on a wider basement. The basement has a plinth and chamfered rustication, and contains a round-arched entrance under a perron leading up to a balcony with wrought iron railings. The temple has a moulded plinth, a blind arcade of eight round arches with pilasters, above which are recessed blind panels. Over this is a frieze, a moulded cornice, a blocking course, and a dome with a moulded cap and a cross finial.	II*
