= Marshside RSPB reserve =

Nature reserve in Southport, Merseyside, England

Marshside
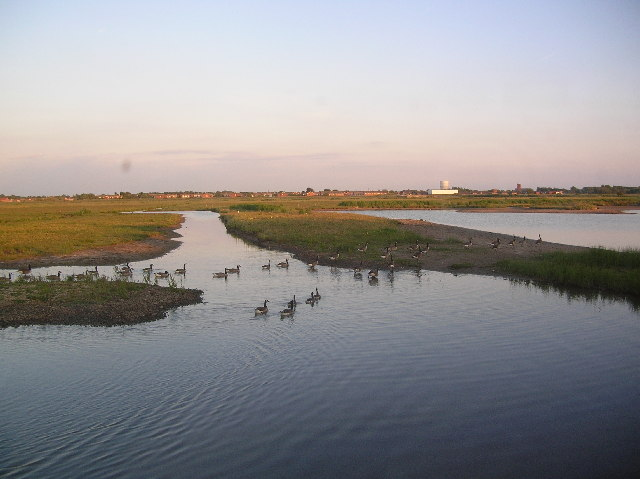
- Interactive map of Marshside
- Type: Wetland nature reserve
- Location: Marshside
- Nearest city: Southport
- OS grid: SD353205
- Coordinates: 53.676942°N 2.980933°W
- Operator: RSPB
- Website: www.rspb.org.uk/reserves-and-events/reserves-a-z/marshside/

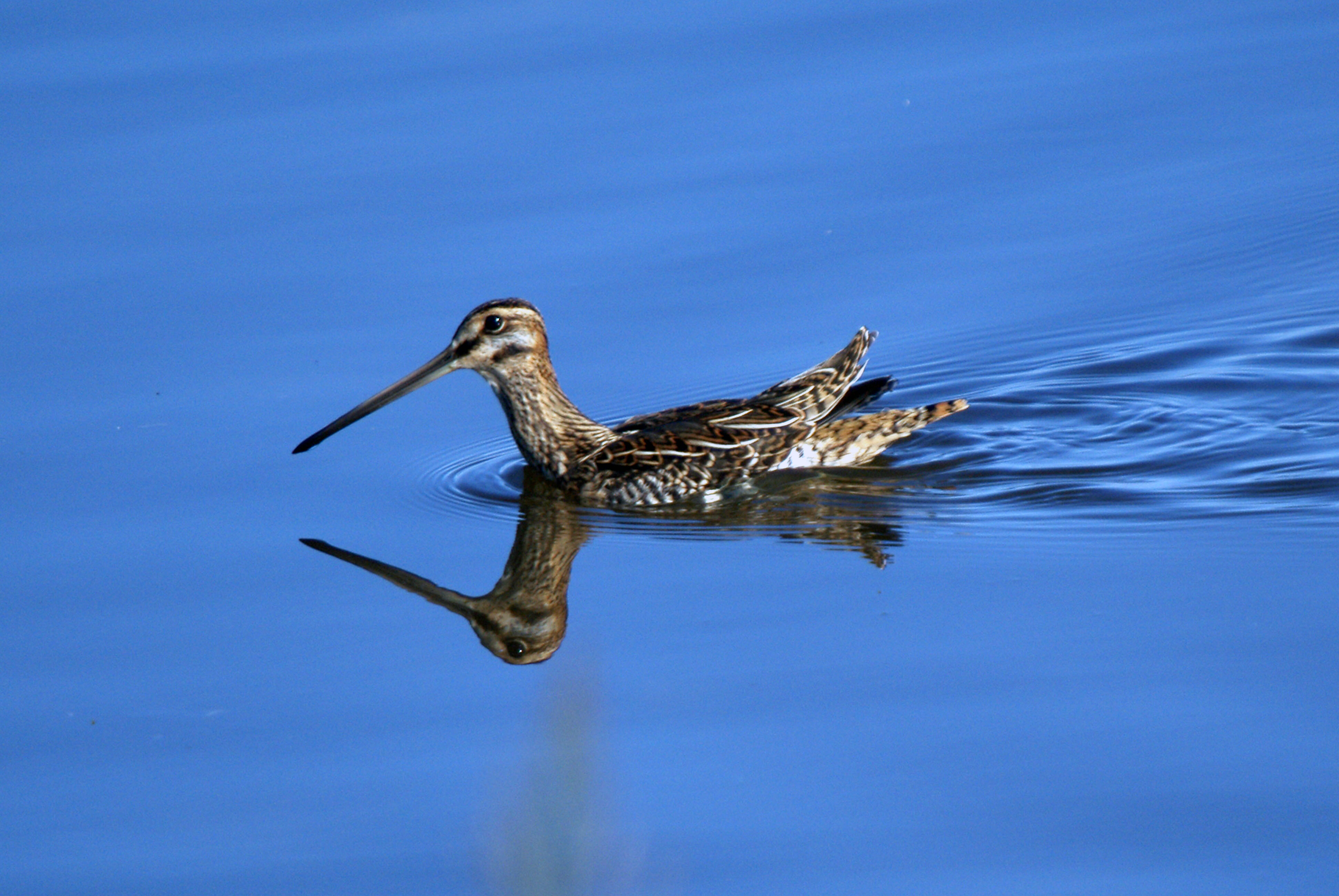
common snipe (Gallinago gallinago) at Marshside

Marshside is a wetland nature reserve operated by the RSPB in the Marshside area of Southport, Merseyside, England. It lies 2 kilometres (1.2 mi) north of the centre of Southport, on the southern side of the Ribble estuary, and is part of the wider Ribble & Alt Estuaries Ramsar reserve. and the Ribble Estuary National Nature Reserve.

The RSPB reserve has two bird hides, the northernmost - named "Sandgrousers' Hide" - serving as a visitor centre. There are also three viewing screens.

The reserve is used by large numbers of overwintering pink footed geese, from Iceland, and wigeon, from Siberia. In summer, species such as avocets and lapwing breed there.

in 2019, the RSPB acquired an adjacent area of wet grassland, Crossens Inner Marsh, in order to extend the reserve.
