= St Cuthbert's Church, Churchtown =

Coordinates: 53.6604°N 2.9620°W

St Cuthbert's
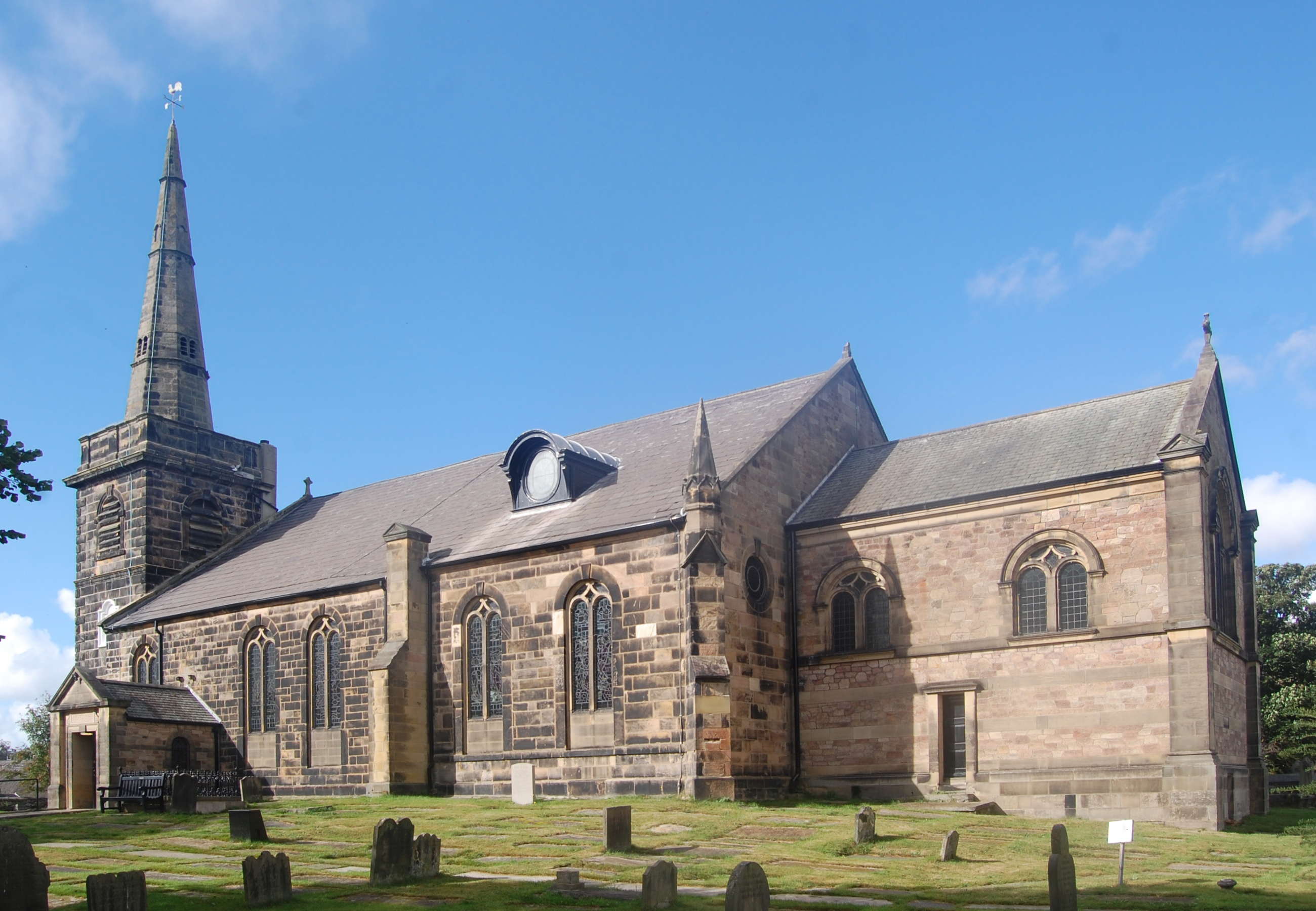
- Saint Cuthbert's Church from the churchyard

- Location in Southport
- OS grid reference: SD 36526 18638
- Location: Churchtown, Merseyside
- Country: England
- Denomination: Anglican

History
- Status: Parish church

Architecture
- Functional status: Active
- Heritage designation: Grade II

Specifications
- Materials: Sandstone and ashlar

Administration
- Province: York
- Diocese: Liverpool
- Archdeaconry: Warrington
- Deanery: North Meols

St Cuthbert's Church is an Anglican church in Churchtown, Merseyside, a village that is now a suburb of Southport in the English county of Merseyside. It is an active parish church in the Diocese of Liverpool and the archdeaconry of Warrington. It has been designated a Grade II listed building by English Heritage. Historically, St Cuthbert's was the parish church of the ecclesiastical parish of North Meols and was within the boundaries of the historic county of Lancashire.

== History and administration ==
There has been a church on the site of St Cuthbert's since at least as far back as the time of King Stephen (d. 1154). It was the parish church of the ecclesiastical parish of North Meols, in the historic county of Lancashire. The current church was built 1730–39 to replace the original structure, which had burned down. Alterations were made in 1806. In 1908–09, architect Isaac Taylor extensively restored the church, leaving little trace of the 1806 work. The chancel dates from this restoration. St Cuthbert's is a Grade II listed building. The church has some very interesting features which include wooden carvings from St Peter's Church in Liverpool, many memorials to the Fleetwood and Hesketh families who owned most of the local area including the family seats of Meols Hall in Churchtown and Greaves Hall in Banks. The stained glass windows in the church are from the 20th century.

St Cuthbert's was designated a Grade II listed building by English Heritage on 21 September 1951. The Grade II designation—the lowest of the three grades—is for buildings that are "nationally important and of special interest". An active church in the Church of England, St Cuthbert's is part of the Diocese of Liverpool, which is in the Province of York. It is in the archdeaconry of Warrington and the Deanery of North Meols.

== Tide ==
The sea at Southport in the past used to inundate much of what is the seafront today, and it is believed that St Cuthbert's Church was constructed on a small hill which protected the church from flooding. Sea defences protect Southport and its suburbs from floods today.

== The Stocks ==
To the left of the churchyard entrance, adjacent to the church wall on St. Cuthbert's Road, are the old village stocks which date from 1741. They have become a landmark within the village and are an original feature to the village.

== Hesketh Family ==
The Hesketh family, who inhabit the village's manor house, Meols Hall, have a family crypt at St Cuthberts.

== Graves ==
It is believed that the founder of Southport William Sutton is buried at the church as it is the oldest church in the town.

== See also ==
- Listed buildings in Churchtown, Merseyside
