= HMS Halsham =

Minesweeper of the Royal Navy

History

United Kingdom
- Name: Halsham
- Namesake: Halsham
- Builder: Jones Buckie Slip & Shipyard
- Launched: 22 September 1953
- Completed: 9 July 1954
- Fate: Sold 1981

General characteristics
- Class & type: Ham-class minesweeper
- Displacement: 120 long tons (122 t) standard; 164 long tons (167 t) full load
- Length: 100 ft (30 m) p/p; 106 ft 6 in (32.46 m) o/a
- Beam: 21 ft 4 in (6.50 m)
- Draught: 5 ft 6 in (1.68 m)
- Propulsion: 2 shaft Paxman 12YHAXM diesels; 1,100 bhp (820 kW)
- Speed: 14 knots (16 mph; 26 km/h)
- Complement: 2 officers, 13 ratings
- Armament: 1 × Bofors 40 mm L/60 gun or Oerlikon 20 mm cannon
- Notes: Pennant number(s): M2633 / IMS35

HMS Halsham was one of 93 ships of the Ham class of inshore minesweepers of the Royal Navy. Their names were all chosen from villages ending in -ham. The minesweeper was named after Halsham in the East Riding of Yorkshire.

She was transferred from the Royal Navy to Royal Air Force duties in 1966, renamed No.5002 (later No.5012) and converted to a research and trials vessel for Royal Aircraft Establishment, Farnborough. By 1972, she was the only remaining RAF-operated marine asset, and to provide continued efficient management she was transferred to the Royal Corps of Transport's civilian fleet and renamed Richard George Masters (later shortened to R G Masters). Private Masters was the sole recipient of the Victoria Cross in the Royal Army Service Corps during the First World War.

In 1979 she was withdrawn from military service, and then sold to Pounds Shipowners & Shipbreakers at Portsmouth, who resold her in 1981 to Greek shipowners Petrakis Line of Corfu. She was renamed Sotirakis and converted to a tourist excursion boat.
