= Churchtown, Merseyside =

Suburb of Southport, Merseyside, England

Coordinates: 53.6596°N 2.9787°W

Churchtown
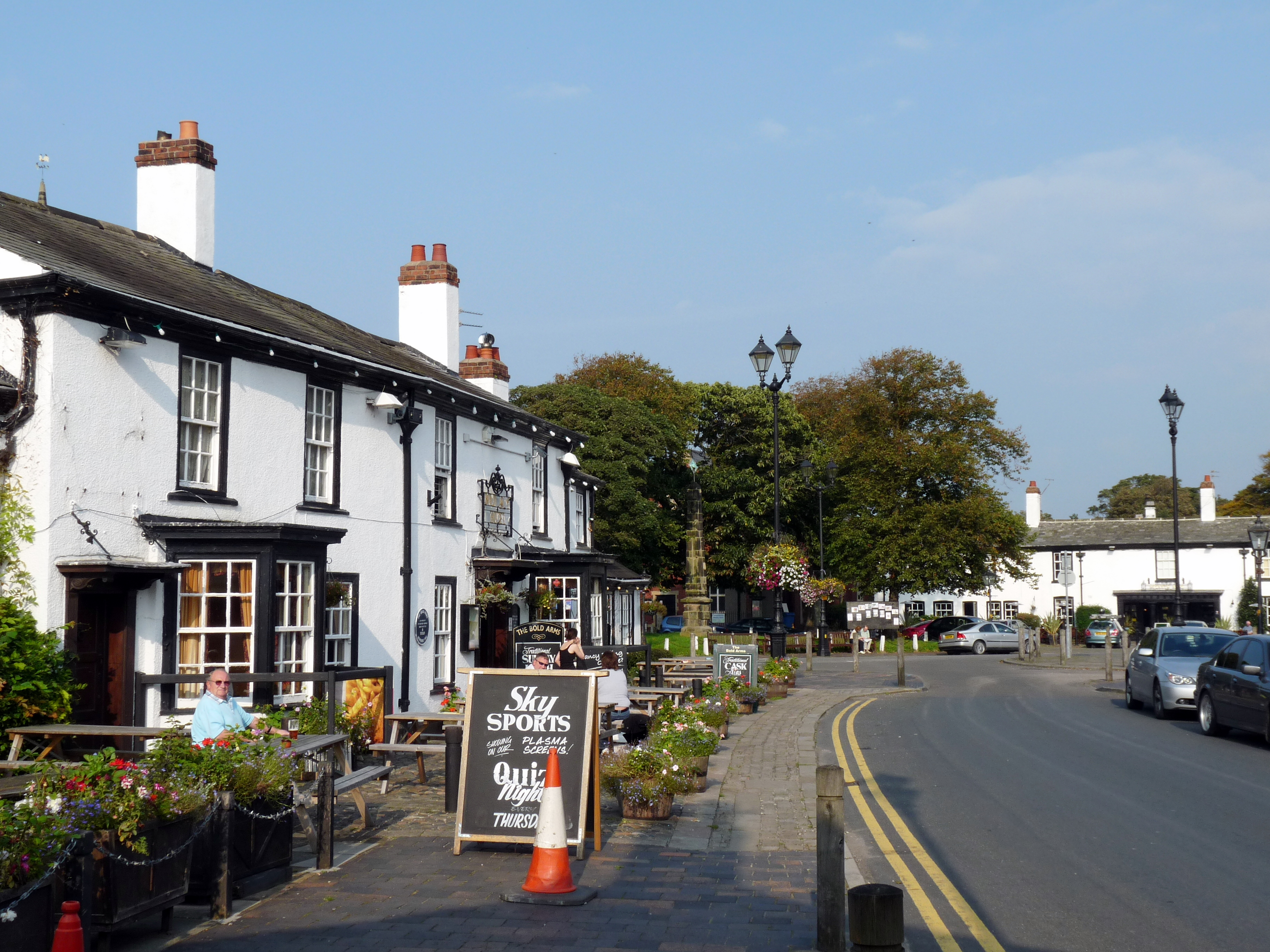
- Bold Arms pub on Botanic Road, looking towards the Hesketh Arms pub and village green

- Location in Southport Location within Merseyside
- OS grid reference: SD365186
- Metropolitan borough: Sefton
- Metropolitan county: Merseyside
- Region: North West
- Country: England
- Sovereign state: United Kingdom
- Post town: SOUTHPORT
- Postcode district: PR9
- Dialling code: 01704
- Police: Merseyside
- Fire: Merseyside
- Ambulance: North West
- UK Parliament: Southport

Churchtown is a suburb of Southport, Merseyside, England. Historically in Lancashire, it is surrounded by Crossens, High Park and Marshside in the ancient parish of North Meols on the northern fringe of what is now Southport.

== History ==
Local folklore claims that a shipwreck in 1577 off the coast of Churchtown brought potatoes to England, and was the first place for them to grow in the country; this is however not a provable claim.

The Botanic Gardens was at one time the terminus for the Southport tram system, and evidence can be seen in the large turning circle at the front of the gardens. Stocks dating from 1741 can be found adjacent to the church wall on St. Cuthbert's Road close to Botanic Gardens. The centre of the old village retains much of its character from bygone ages - with the green in front of St Cuthbert's Church flanked by the two local pubs - the Bold Arms and the Hesketh Arms. This is covered by a preservation order which covers much of Botanic Road, where some thatched cottages still exist. On one side of the Hesketh Arms is the entrance to Meols Hall, home of the Hesketh family.

== Geography ==
Churchtown is situated in North West England. The closest cities are Preston to the north east and Liverpool to the south. Churchtown is a suburb of Southport which has the nearest town centre.

To the North of Churchtown, is Crossens, which is the most northerly suburb of Southport. To the west of Churchtown is Marshside, to the east High Park, and to the south is the Hesketh Park area.

The village is one of many villages on the West Lancashire Coastal Plain, most of the village is only slightly above sea-level just like the nearby village of Banks which means the village can be susceptible to flooding during heavy rainfall. There are embankments to the north of nearby Marshside and there are drainage systems across the area, the closest being the Three Pools Waterway to the East of the village which is controlled by the pumping station at the Banks/ Crossens border.

== Education ==
Churchtown has one primary school (Churchtown Primary School) which is situated on St Cuthbert's Road and access is also available via Botanic Gardens The school is a "community school" (i.e. not a church school) but is closely associated with St Cuthbert's Church. It is among the ten biggest primary schools in the country, with nearly 900 pupils, and was described by OFSTED in February 2010 as "outstanding" (grade 1). In 2017, there was a further short inspection and the school was rated "good"

== Religious sites ==
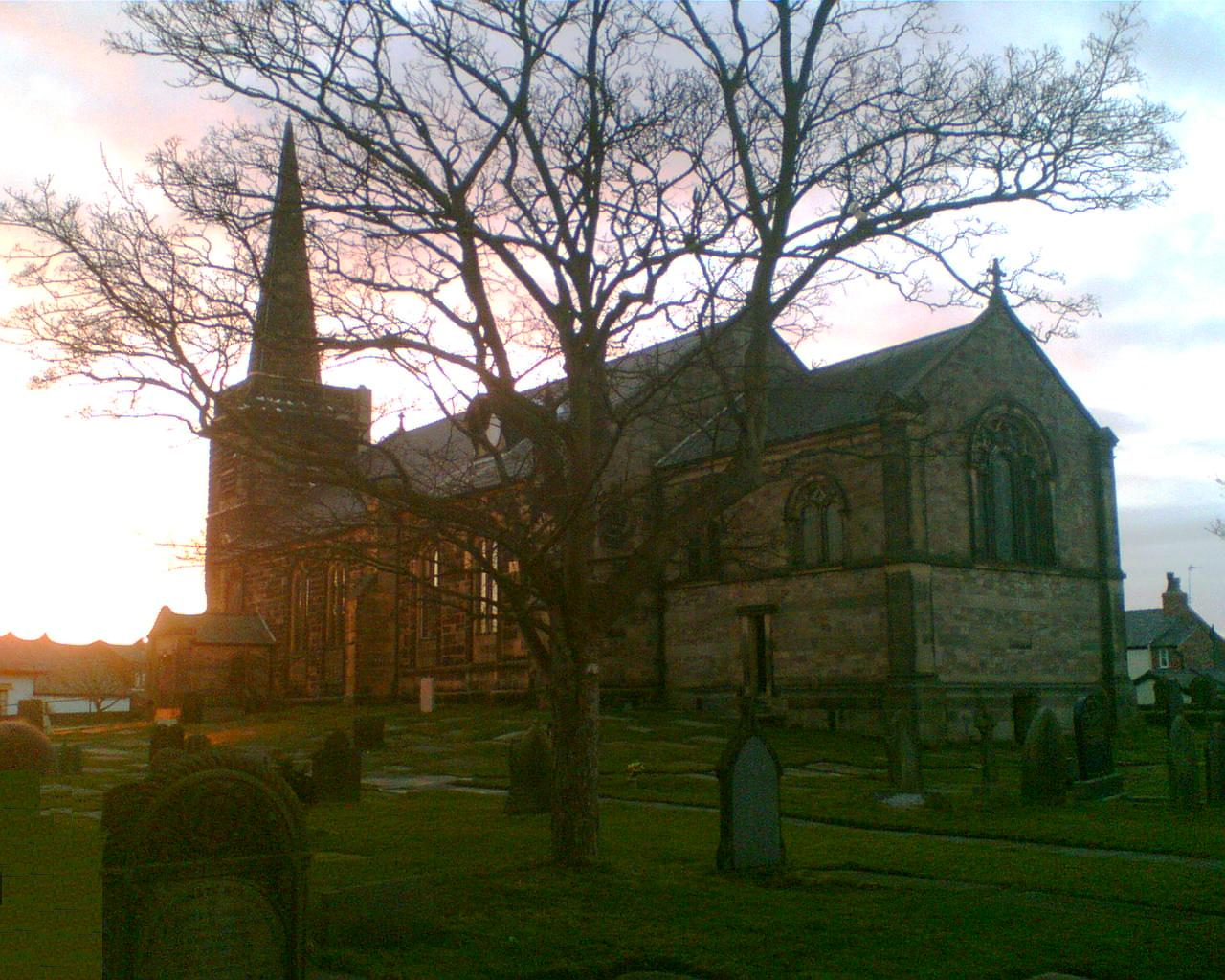
St Cuthberts Church from the Grave Yard 2008

The village has four churches

- St Cuthbert's Church - Church of England - St Cuthberts Road
- Churchtown United Reformed Church - Non-Conformist - Botanic Road
- Marshside Road Methodist Church - on the border between Churchtown and Marshside
- St Patrick Catholic Church, Marshside Road

== Public Services ==
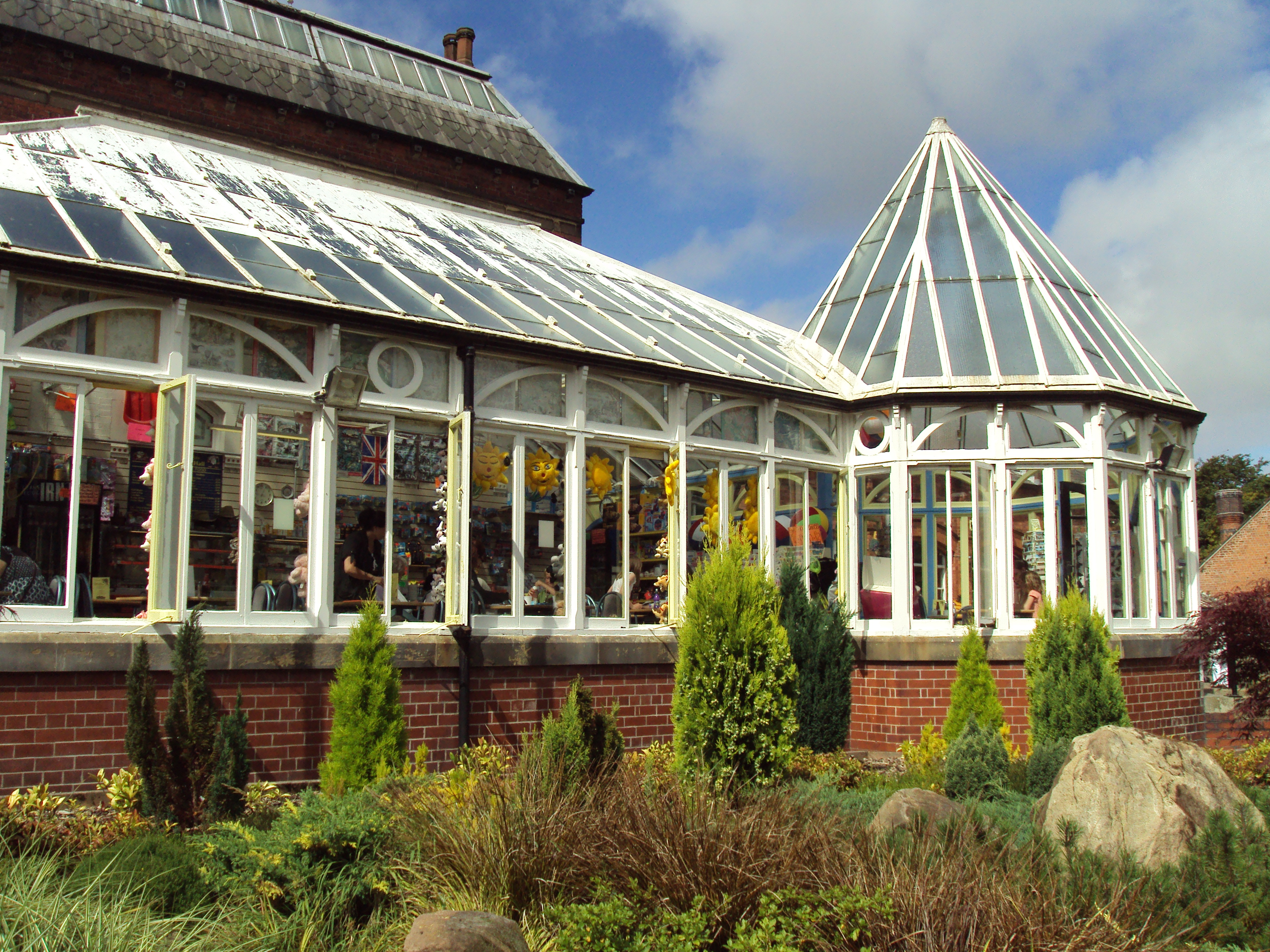
Botanic Gardens Cafe

- Churchtown Medical Centre
- Corner Surgery - closed in 2006 and moved to a new surgery situated on the Co-op Complex in Marshside.
- Two Pharmacies
- A Conservative Club
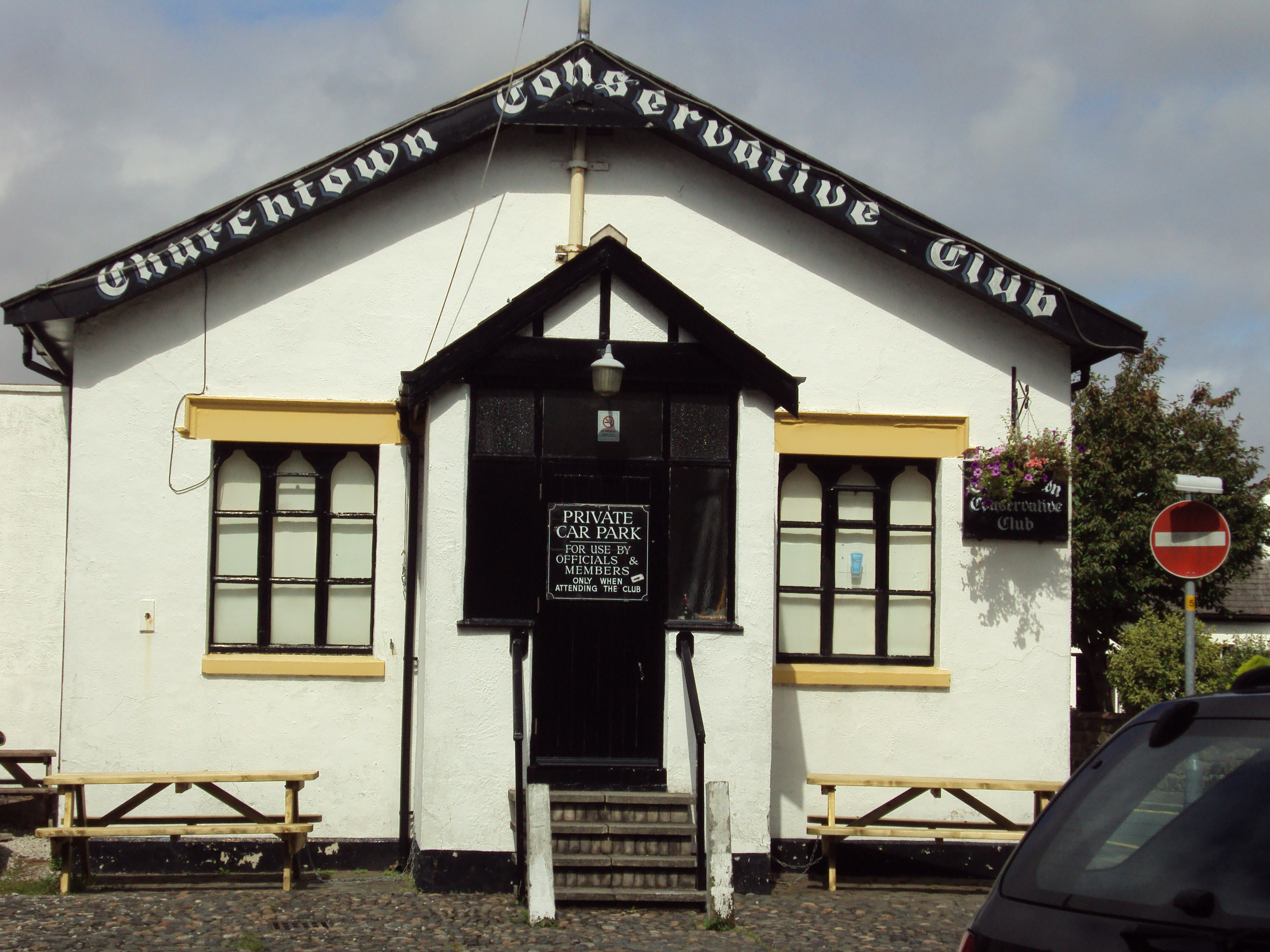
  Churchtown Conservative Club
- Churchtown Dental Practice
- Tesco Express
- Two Spar Off Licences
- Six Hairdressers/ Barbers
- Museum - Situated in Botanic Gardens Closed 2012 as a result of government national budgetary cuts. Contents removed and dispersed. Some contents remain under the control of Merseyside Museums, and the dug-out canoe formerly in the Museum was placed in the Atkinson, Southport Town Centre in 2014 after preservation treatment.
- Library. Closed 2014 as a result of government national budgetary cuts. The library building was demolished shortly after closure, probably because it was largely of wooden construction and so at particular risk of vandalism and fire.
- Churchtown Garage
- Hesketh Arms Public House
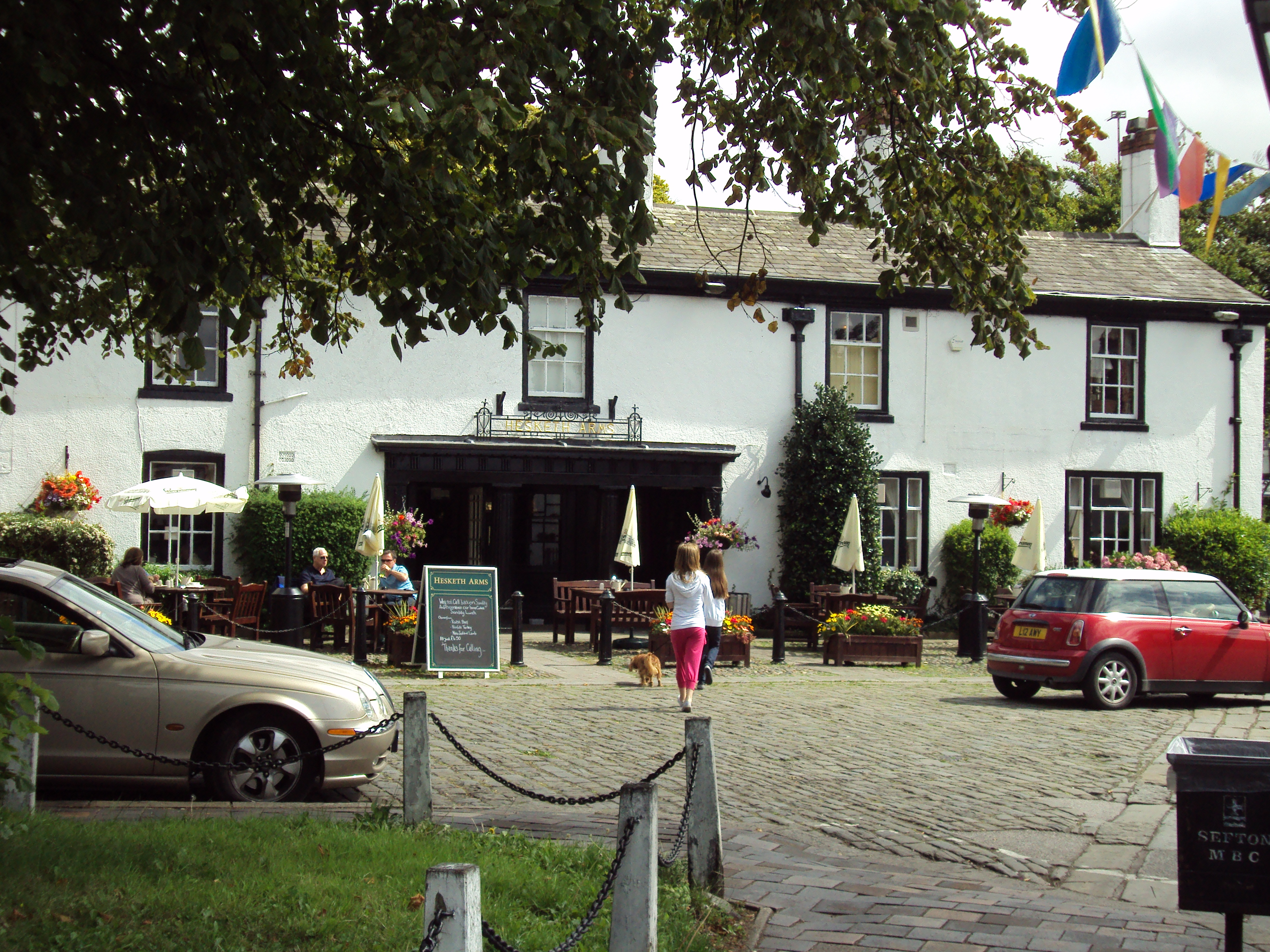
  Hesketh Arms Pub
- Bold Arms Public House
- A Funeral Director
- A Veterinary Practice
- An Optician
- A jewellers / repair shop
- A newsagent
- Three Solicitors
- One podiatry/chiropody practice
- One reflexologist

Other amenities in the Churchtown include: Two Bakeries, Subway (Sandwich shop), Garden Centre, Antiques Shops, Two DIY shops, Three Take-Away Shops, Two Florists, Two Furniture Shops, Three Cafes, Printer Shops, Two Beauty Shops and many more smaller shops.

== Leisure ==
Southport Old Links is a golf Course situated to the south of the village.

== Transport ==
Churchtown railway station was a stop on the West Lancashire Railway to Crossens and Preston. The line closed in 1964. The A565 road runs through the north of the village and is considered by some local people to be the boundary of Churchtown and Marshside. There are many bus stops throughout the village and local area which link to all over the Southport area and suburbs, with services extending into Liverpool, West Lancashire, and Preston.

== See also ==
- Listed buildings in Churchtown, Merseyside
