= Hesketh Park, Southport =

Public park in England

Hesketh Park
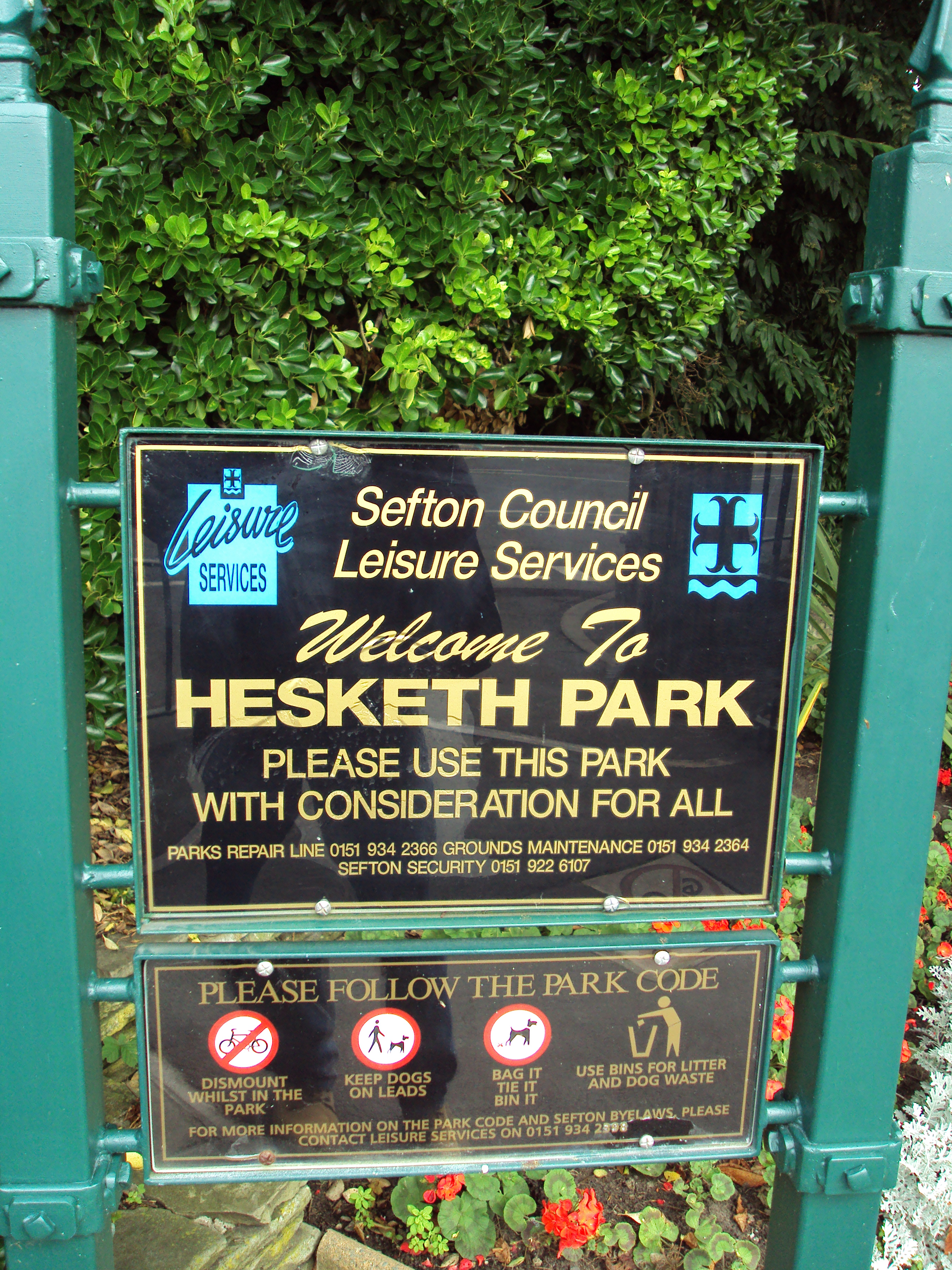
- Hesketh Park entrance sign

- Location within Southport town centre
- Type: Public park
- Location: Southport, England
- Coordinates: 53.656°N 2.987°W
- Area: 12 hectares (30 acres)
- Created: 1868
- Designer: Edward Kemp
- Operator: Sefton Council
- Status: Open all year round

Hesketh Park is a public park situated near the north end of Lord Street in the Victorian seaside town of Southport, Merseyside, England. It was designed as a public park in the mid-19th century by Edward Kemp, and was further developed in the 20th century. The land was donated by the Rev Charles Hesketh and has many Victorian features and landscape designs.

== History ==
The land Hesketh Park occupies was once (like the rest of Southport) sand dunes and beach, as the tides receded and the town of Southport grew, the need for a park was proposed. The land at the time was owned by Rev Charles Hesketh of Meols Hall, who donated the land for use as a public park. Hesketh Park was created by the Southport Commissioners through the Southport Improvement Act 1865 (28 & 29 Vict. c. cxcv). Edward Kemp laid out the park which is of a near oval shape, possibly to the design of Joseph Paxton for whom Kemp had worked at Birkenhead Park. The layout cost of Hesketh Park was £12,000 and the park was officially opened in 1868. Various structures have been added to the park since it opened and some alterations have been made through the later 19th and 20th centuries. The main alterations happened in 2007 when the park was restored as part of a major refurbishment and restoration scheme.

== Facilities ==
The park visitor facilities include a Cafe and Play Area which is situated on the east side of the park and also features a crazy golf, the play area was dramatically reduced due to the restoration project with a whole new play area created on one half and the other half was grassed over for a field for ball games. The park toilet facilities were also upgraded as part of the restoration project and are situated near the east entrance to the park.

== Notable features ==
=== Park Lodges ===
The Park has two gate houses at two of the entrances to the park. They are lived in by the park keepers and have colourful annual flower beds outside each lodge.

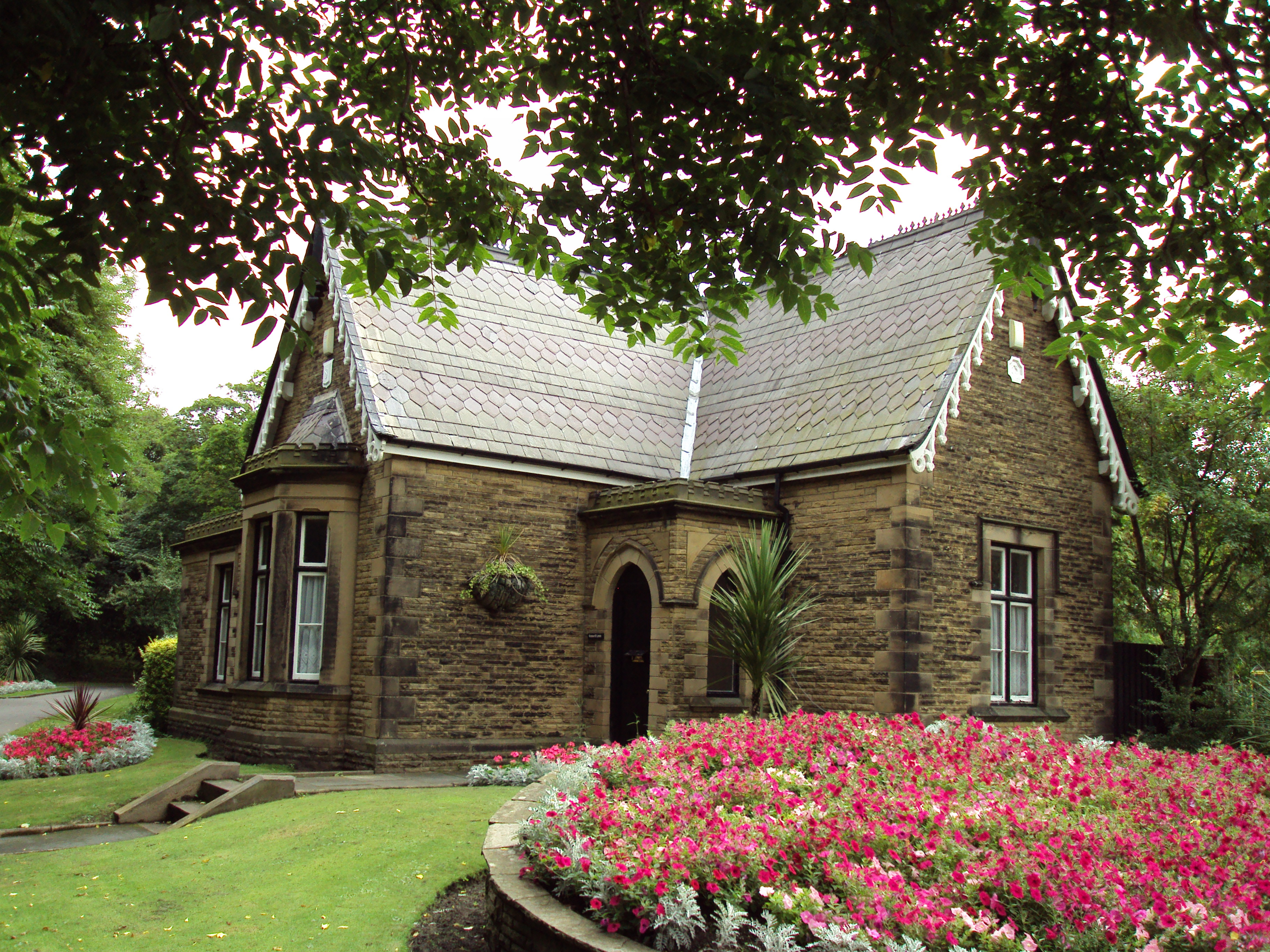
Queens Lodge is one of the gate houses to the park.

=== Glasshouses ===
The Glasshouses are the green house development by where the floral displays for the park are grown, this is a private area which is not accessible to the public and is situated behind the Conservatory.

=== Aviary ===
The Aviary once housed many exotic birds which included flamingos up until the late 1990s but due to neglect of the cages, the birds were removed. In 2007 as part of the park restoration project the damaged cages were removed, with the overgrown foliage and the remaining birds moved into the central remaining cages. There are future plans to restore the aviary but the project is awaiting funding.

=== Conservatory ===
The Conservatory was once full of exotic plants, but since restoration in 2007 the plants were removed while the whole building was taken down and later restored on the same site.

=== Lake ===
The Lake is the biggest feature in the park, situated at the centre, it has a small island in the centre which was created for the wild birds which live and breed on the lake. The lake was restored to its full size with the extension to the west end of the lake in 2007, as part of the main restoration project. The lake once featured boats but since the restoration of the lake the boats have not returned to the lake.

==== Waterfall ====
The waterfall is situated to the north central bank of the lake. For many years the waterfall lay inactive and overgrown, up until the park restoration project which saw the revamp to the waterfall area and the removal of trees from the surrounding area.

=== Floral Clock ===
The Floral Clock is another feature of the park that has been restored, it is planted up with annual flowers each year in the formation of the Roman numerals and a decorative pattern. Many visitors since the Victorian period have come to visit the park just to see the clock and hear the cuckoo call when the clock strikes the hour. The clock is currently not in full working order.

=== Observatory ===
The astronomical observatory stands on a small mound in the centre of the park. It was originally the private observatory of Joseph Baxendell FRAS (1815–1887). Baxendell arrived in Southport in the late 1800s having retired from his post as Timekeeping astronomer for the City of Manchester. He had been invited by John Fernley to come and manage the running of his recently opened Meteorological Observatory also sited in the Park. Baxendell was to continue his astronomical work in his observatory at his home in Liverpool Road. After his death the Baxendell family offered the observatory and its equipment to the then Southport Corporation (Education Department) and was duly opened in September 1901 and a detailed description of the ceremony appeared on 5 September 1901 in the "Southport Visitor". The observatory was open to the public who were able to purchase tickets at the Town Hall and local Newsagent and the visits were supervised by a Mr Ralph Green and other members of the Meteorological Observatory team.

Activity became sparse during the war years and in the 1960s the Education Department handed management of the observatory to Southport College. Their Head of Maths and Physics, John Bryson, who used the observatory for his work as a teacher also voluntarily opened the observatory every week during the winter months, when the weather was suitable, to members of the public. By 1980 the observatory fell into disuse mainly due to the encroachment of forest trees making observations difficult or impossible.

However, in 1985/6 the Education Department took a hand and managed a minor refurbishment of the building and telescope. The object was to use the facilities for organized school visits and invite the Astronomical Society to come back and make use of the building as well as organize Open Days and observational visits on suitable occasions.

Although the Southport Astronomical Society continue to use the observatory these ceased when the observatory was included in the 2007 refurbishment of the Park and Observatory. The building now has an electricity supply and telephone access but unfortunately during the building refurbishment a copper lining was used on the dome which attracted the attentions of illegal copper merchants. This has caused some damage to the dome. Although the dome metal runner was also renewed at this time it has not proved satisfactory and until this is put right the observatory cannot be used for observational work. The 2017 refurbishment is now complete and the observatory is now almost ready for opening to the general public on suitable occasions.

Some final work is being undertaken on the telescope and will hopefully be fully functional during the winter. The Astronomical Society continue to use the building for some of their meetings ( a bit of a squash on some evenings!) and will be present on Open Days when members will be available to talk to visitors about the observatory and the society.

== Featured gardens ==
=== Rose Garden ===
The Rose Garden is a formal garden dedicated to many varieties of roses and was very well known in the Victorian era. The Rose Garden was renovated in 2016 with the Victorian roses being replaced with modern roses from the David Austin nursery in Albrighton. The money for renovation being given as a grant from the National Lottery. Some of the Victorian roses are planted in an area not accessible to members of the public. The park still has many of the original varieties of roses which were originally growing in the Victorian era.

=== Rock Garden ===
The Rock Garden is a feature in a crater type garden on the top of a hill, it is accessed by sloping paths and by steep steps which once led to a shelter at the top. The seating shelter was removed and a seating/ viewing area was created. The rock garden also feature specimen trees such as atlas cedars and redwood trees.

=== Blind Garden ===
The blind and disabled sensory garden was created in Hesketh Park in 1995 and its opening is commemorated by a plaque at its entranceway. In 2025, the sensory garden was refurbished by workers and volunteers and is now open to the public.

== Parkrun ==
Hesketh Park is home to Southport Parkrun, a free 5 km timed event, which is open to all and fully staffed by volunteers. The first Southport Parkrun took place on 11 June 2016.

On 26 August 2017 Southport Parkrun hosted the BBC for filming of Parkrun UK's Finalist Video for the National Lottery Awards. Michelle Ackerly presented this segment of filming and announced during filming that the Parkrun Visually Impaired project had won the Sports Category award. The award was presented in the studio by Libby Clegg.
