= All Saints' Church, Halsham =

Church in Halsham, East Riding of Yorkshire, England

Coordinates: 53.7307°N 0.0793°W

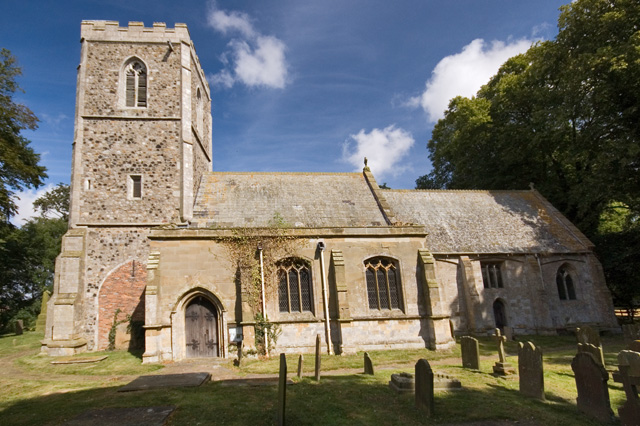
The church, in 2016

All Saints' Church is the parish church of Halsham, a village in the East Riding of Yorkshire, in England.

The church was built in the early 12th century, from which period the nave survives. A north aisle was added later in the century, of which the arcade remains, and the chancel is of similar date. The south and east sides of the chancel were rebuilt in the 14th century, when the tower and south aisle of the nave were also constructed. In the 15th century, the north aisle was rebuilt, and the buttresses were added to the tower. A north chapel was rebuilt in the early 18th century, and in 1720 the chancel arch was remodelled. The church was restored between 1869 and 1870 by Ewan Christian, the work including new roofs. The church was grade I listed in 1966.

The church is built of cobble, limestone and brick, and has a slate roof, with lead on the north chapel. The church consists of a nave, north and south aisles, a chancel with a north chapel, and a west tower. The tower has three stages, a moulded plinth, angle and diagonal buttresses, slit windows, moulded string courses, and a three-light west window with a hood mould, above which is an ogee-headed niche with an angel corbel. The middle stage has a small square window on the south, the bell openings have two lights with pointed heads, and above is a gargoyle, and a coped embattled parapet.

Inside, the south side of the chancel has a row of sedilia which may date from as early as the 11th century, more elaborate 14th-century sedilia under an ogee arch, and a piscina with a similar arch. The north chapel has a pair of sedilia and the alabaster effigy of John Constable, dating from the later 15th century. The oak pulpit was carved in 1634, while there is an octagonal 19th-century font.

== See also ==
- Grade I listed buildings in the East Riding of Yorkshire
- Listed buildings in Halsham
