= Meols Hall =

Listed building in Merseyside, England

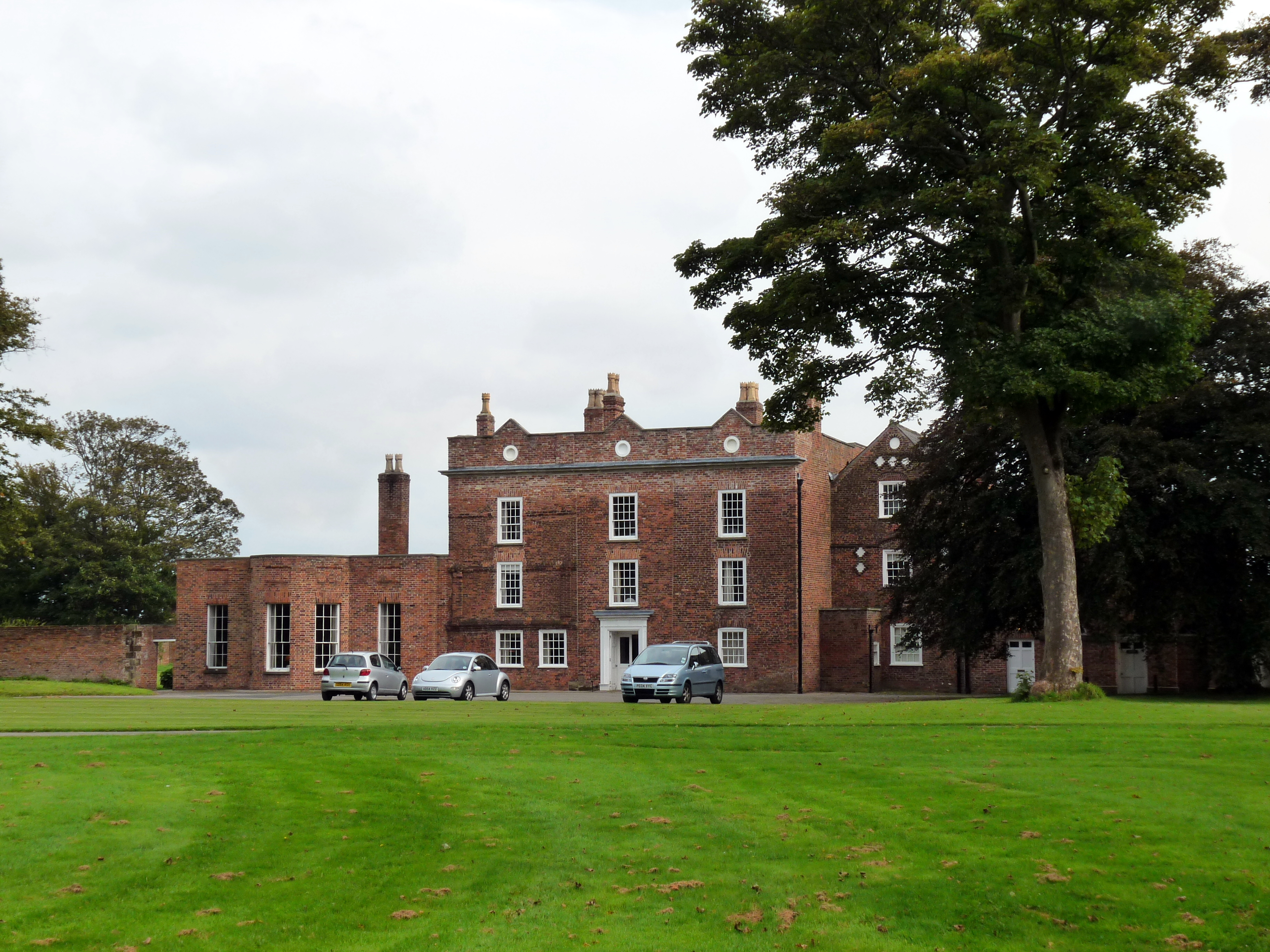
- The hall in September 2008

- Location in Merseyside

General information
- Type: Manor house
- Location: Churchtown, Merseyside, England
- Coordinates: 53.657°N 2.962°W
- Year built: 17th century
- Renovated: 18th and 19th centuries (altered); 1960–64 (reconstructed)

Design and construction
- Architect: Roger Fleetwood Hesketh
- Designations

Listed Building – Grade II*
- Official name: Meols Hall
- Designated: 15 November 1972
- Reference no.: 1379553

Meols Hall is a historical manor house in Churchtown, Merseyside, England, dating from the 12th century with a 16th-century tithe barn restored for wedding receptions and ceremonies.

== History ==
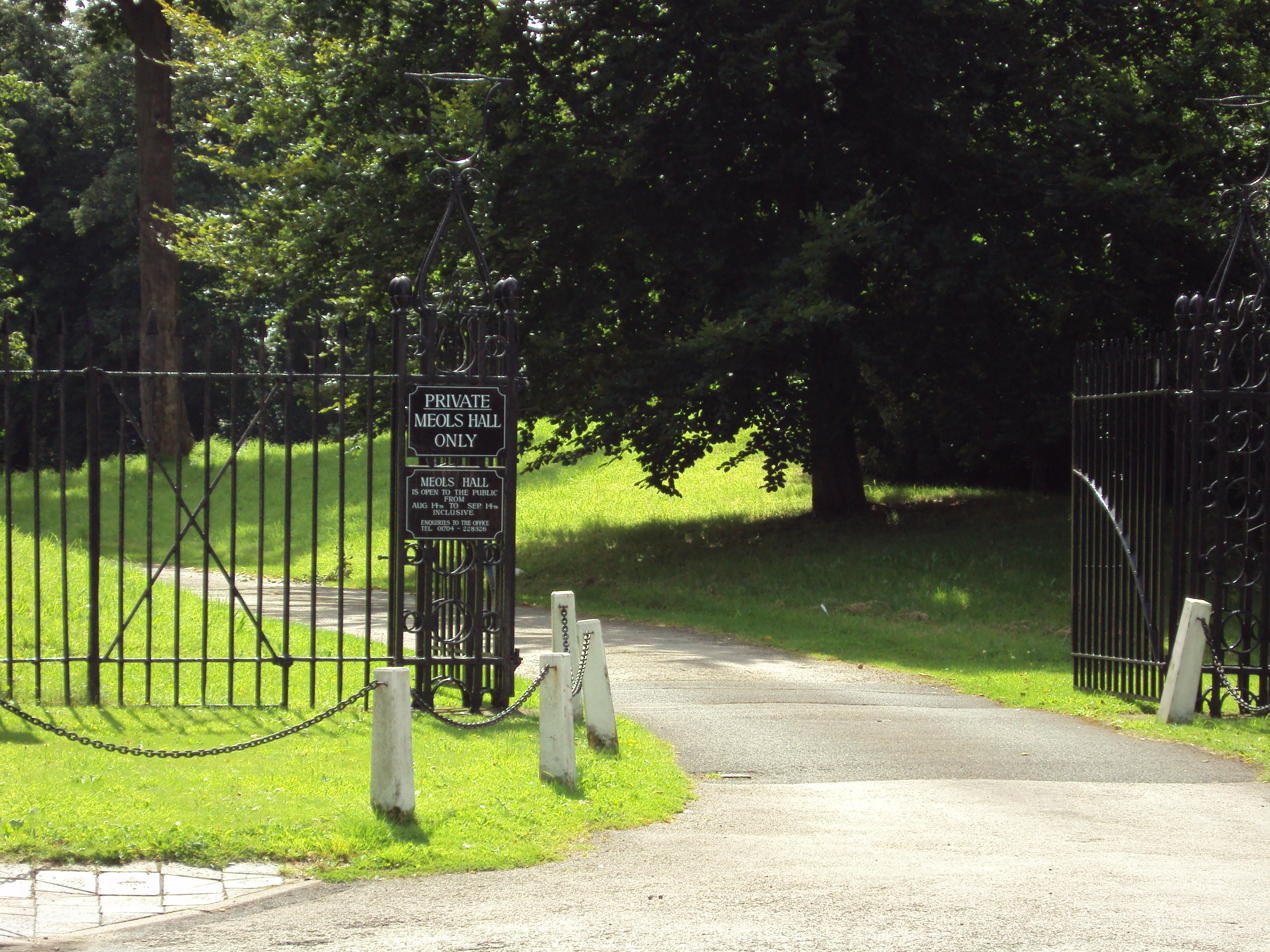
Meols Hall entrance, Botanic Road

Meols Hall dates back to the late 12th century when the manor was granted to Robert de Coudray of Penwortham. The manor has been passed down through marriage and inheritance to the present incumbent. In the 16th century, it was inherited by Alice Kitchin. She married Hugh, an illegitimate son of the Heskeths of Rufford. Subsequent generations have styled themselves or changed their name to Hesketh. Much of the old house was demolished in the mid-18th century, reducing the building to its mid-17th-century core and a wing dating from c. 1695. Meols Hall was subsequently used as a farmhouse, until the family of Charles Hesketh (né Bibby) took residence in 1919.

Modest additions were made to the house in 1938, but the main reconstruction work was carried out between 1960 and 1964 by Roger Fleetwood Hesketh to his own design. This included the three-storeyed red brick east front built in the style of Francis Smith of Warwick, and used stonework from Lathom House, rescued as it was about to be dumped in a disused Liverpool dock.

Meols Hall has been acclaimed as "one of the most convincing country houses" constructed since World War II, and is a Grade II* listed building.

== See also ==
- Grade II* listed buildings in Merseyside
- Listed buildings in Churchtown, Merseyside
