= West Lancashire Borough Council elections =

Local government elections in Lancashire, England

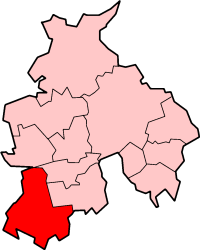
West Lancashire shown within the non-metropolitan county of Lancashire (Unitary authorities excluded)

West Lancashire Borough Council elections are generally held three years out of every four, with a third of the council elected each time. West Lancashire Borough Council is the local authority for the non-metropolitan district of West Lancashire in Lancashire, England. Since the last boundary changes in 2023 the council has comprised 45 councillors representing 15 wards, with each ward electing three councillors.

== Council elections ==
- 1973 West Lancashire District Council election
- 1976 West Lancashire District Council election (New ward boundaries)
- 1979 West Lancashire District Council election
- 1980 West Lancashire District Council election
- 1982 West Lancashire District Council election (District boundary changes took place but the number of seats remained the same)
- 1983 West Lancashire District Council election
- 1984 West Lancashire District Council election
- 1986 West Lancashire District Council election
- 1987 West Lancashire District Council election
- 1988 West Lancashire District Council election
- 1990 West Lancashire District Council election
- 1991 West Lancashire District Council election
- 1992 West Lancashire District Council election
- 1994 West Lancashire District Council election (District boundary changes took place but the number of seats remained the same)
- 1995 West Lancashire District Council election
- 1996 West Lancashire District Council election
- 1998 West Lancashire District Council election
- 1999 West Lancashire District Council election
- 2000 West Lancashire District Council election
- 2002 West Lancashire District Council election (New ward boundaries reduced the number of seats by 1)
- 2003 West Lancashire District Council election
- 2004 West Lancashire District Council election
- 2006 West Lancashire District Council election
- 2007 West Lancashire District Council election (Some new ward boundaries)
- 2008 West Lancashire District Council election
- 2010 West Lancashire Borough Council election
- 2011 West Lancashire Borough Council election
- 2012 West Lancashire Borough Council election
- 2014 West Lancashire Borough Council election
- 2015 West Lancashire Borough Council election
- 2016 West Lancashire Borough Council election
- 2018 West Lancashire Borough Council election
- 2019 West Lancashire Borough Council election
- 2021 West Lancashire Borough Council election
- 2022 West Lancashire Borough Council election
- 2023 West Lancashire Borough Council election (Reduced to 45 council seats)
- 2024 West Lancashire Borough Council election
- 2026 West Lancashire Borough Council election

== Borough result maps ==
2002 results map

2003 results map

2004 results map

2006 results map

2007 results map

2008 results map

2010 results map

2011 results map

2012 results map

2014 results map

2015 results map

2016 results map

2018 results map

2019 results map

2021 results map

2022 results map

2023 results map

2024 results map

2026 results map

== By-election results ==
=== 1994-1998 ===
Birch Green By-Election 6 March 1997
Party	Candidate	Votes	%	±%
Labour		1,537	87.7	
Conservative		215	12.3	
Majority		1,322	75.4	
Turnout		1,752	23.0	
Labour hold		Swing		

Upholland South By-Election 6 March 1997
Party	Candidate	Votes	%	±%
Labour		745	67.0	
Conservative		367	3.0	
Majority		378	34.0	
Turnout		1,112	44.3	
Labour hold		Swing		

Tanhouse By-Election 24 July 1997
Party	Candidate	Votes	%	±%
Labour		435	90.6	+2.7
Conservative		45	9.4	+0.4
Majority		390	81.2	
Turnout		480	13.6	
Labour hold		Swing		

=== 1998-2002 ===
Burscough By-Election 30 July 1998
Party	Candidate	Votes	%	±%
Labour		585	50.0	−7.4
Conservative		533	45.6	+5.0
Liberal Democrats		45	3.8	+3.8
Natural Law		7	0.6	−1.4
Majority		52	4.4	
Turnout		1,170		
Labour hold		Swing		

Knowsley By-Election 7 June 2001
Party	Candidate	Votes	%	±%
Conservative		1,385	50.4	−8.7
Labour		1,363	49.6	+12.1
Majority		22	0.8	
Turnout		2,748		
Conservative gain from Independent		Swing		

Upholland South By-Election 7 June 2001
Party	Candidate	Votes	%	±%
Labour		929	58.5	+1.1
Conservative		660	41.5	+3.1
Majority		269	17.0	
Turnout		1,589		
Labour hold		Swing		

Derby By-Election 13 December 2001
Party	Candidate	Votes	%	±%
Conservative		571	63.4	+10.0
Labour		330	36.6	−6.0
Majority		241	26.8	
Turnout		901	14.0	
Conservative hold		Swing		

Tanhouse By-Election 13 December 2001
Party	Candidate	Votes	%	±%
Labour		220	81.8	+9.5
Conservative		49	18.2	−9.5
Majority		179	63.8	
Turnout		269	8.3	
Labour hold		Swing		

=== 2002-2006 ===
Up Holland By-Election 13 October 2005
Party	Candidate	Votes	%	±%
Labour		608	59.8	+11.8
Conservative		408	40.2	+4.7
Majority		200	19.6	
Turnout		1,016	20.5	
Labour hold		Swing		

=== 2006-2010 ===
Digmoor By-Election 4 June 2009
Party	Candidate	Votes	%	±%
Labour	Jackie Coyle	515	59.8	−16.7
UKIP	Helen Daniels	236	27.4	+27.4
Conservative	Sarah Ainscough	110	12.8	−10.7
Majority		279	32.4	
Turnout		861	27.9	
Labour hold		Swing		

=== 2010-2014 ===
Skelmersdale South By-Election 2 September 2010
Party	Candidate	Votes	%	±%
Labour	Nicola Pryce Roberts	644	73.9	+0.6
Conservative	Sarah Ainscough	122	14.0	−4.2
UKIP	Michael Brennan	105	12.1	+12.1
Majority		522	59.9	
Turnout		871	17.6	
Labour hold		Swing		

Upholland By-Election 2 September 2010
Party	Candidate	Votes	%	±%
Labour	John Fillis	749	51.2	−6.9
Conservative	David Sudworth	597	40.8	−1.2
UKIP	Gary McNulty	118	8.1	+8.1
Majority		152	10.4	
Turnout		1,464	29.5	
Labour hold		Swing		

Digmoor By-Election 2 May 2013
Party	Candidate	Votes	%	±%
Labour	Chris Wynn	685	86.8	−3.8
Green	Peter Cranie	57	7.2	+7.2
Conservative	Edward McCarthy	47	6.0	−1.3
Majority		628	79.6	
Turnout		789		
Labour hold		Swing		

Parbold By-Election 10 October 2013
Party	Candidate	Votes	%	±%
Conservative	David Whittington	554	49.6	−18.3
Labour	Clare Gillard	461	41.2	+9.1
UKIP	Damon Noone	103	9.2	+9.2
Majority		93	8.3	
Turnout		1,118		
Conservative hold		Swing		

=== 2014-2018 ===
Skelmersdale North By-Election 11 December 2014
Party	Candidate	Votes	%	±%
Labour	Jennifer Patterson	591	87.9	−1.8
Conservative	David Meadows	81	12.1	+1.8
Majority		510	75.9	
Turnout		672		
Labour hold		Swing		

Aughton Park By-Election 8 June 2017
Party	Candidate	Votes	%	±%
Conservative	Doreen Stephenson	1,381	55.8	+7.4
Labour	Bernie Green	1,095	44.2	+8.7
Majority		286	11.6	
Turnout		2,476		
Conservative hold		Swing		

Derby by-election 29 June 2017
Party	Candidate	Votes	%	±%
OWL	Ian Davis	705	42.4	+0.6
Labour	George Oliver	596	35.8	−1.0
Conservative	Jane Houlgrave	362	21.8	+4.2
Majority		109	6.6	
Turnout		1,667		
OWL gain from Conservative		Swing		

=== 2018-2022 ===
Hesketh-with-Becconsall by-election 19 July 2018
Party	Candidate	Votes	%	±%
Conservative	Joan Witter	510	41.2	−18.6
Labour	Nick Kemp	432	34.9	+4.0
Independent	Steve Kirby	295	23.8	+23.8
Majority		78	6.3	
Turnout		1,237		
Conservative hold		Swing		

Knowsley by-election 26 July 2018
Party	Candidate	Votes	%	±%
Labour	Gareth Dowling	641	40.8	−10.1
OWL	Kate Mitchell	567	36.1	+20.7
Conservative	Jeffrey Vernon	364	23.2	−10.6
Majority		74	4.7	
Turnout		1,572		
Labour hold		Swing		

Tanhouse by-election 11 October 2018
Party	Candidate	Votes	%	±%
Labour	Ron Cooper	464	72.3	−12.8
Independent	Aaron Body	129	20.1	+20.1
Conservative	Alexander Blundell	49	7.6	−7.3
Majority		335	52.2	
Turnout		642		
Labour hold		Swing		

Birch Green by-election 21 November 2019
Party	Candidate	Votes	%	±%
Labour	Sue Gregson	390	60.8	+2.2
Skelmersdale Independent Party	Andrew Taylor	191	29.8	−5.3
Conservative	George Rear	60	9.4	+3.1
Majority		199	31.0	
Turnout		641		
Labour hold		Swing		

North Meols by-election 4 November 2021
Party	Candidate	Votes	%	±%
Conservative	John Howard	634	64.9	
Labour	Liz Savage	343	35.1	
Majority		291	29.8	
Turnout		977		
Conservative hold		Swing		

=== 2022-2026 ===
Aughton and Holborn by-election 9 October 2025
Party	Candidate	Votes	%	±%
OWL	Gordon Johnson	704	35.5	+10.4
Reform	Aaron Body	478	24.1	+18.6
Labour	Karl Taraldsen	385	19.4	−21.3
Conservative	Bruce Porteous	295	14.9	−8.7
Green	Charlotte Houltram	78	3.9	−1.2
Liberal Democrats	Peter Chandler	42	2.1	+2.1
Majority		226	11.4	
Turnout		1,982		
OWL gain from Labour		Swing		
