= 2011 West Lancashire Borough Council election =

2011 UK local government election

Results of the 2011 West Lancashire Borough Council election

The 2011 West Lancashire Borough Council election took place on 5 May 2011 to elect members of West Lancashire Borough Council in Lancashire, England. One third of the council was up for election, with results compared to the corresponding vote in 2007 West Lancashire Council election.

== Ward results ==
=== Ashurst ===
Ashurst
Party	Candidate	Votes	%	±%
Labour	Liz Savage	1285	77.3%	
Conservative	Stacey Griffiths	377	22.7%	
Majority		908		
Turnout		1691	34.94%	
Labour hold		Swing		

=== Aughton and Downholland ===
Aughton and Downholland
Party	Candidate	Votes	%	±%
Conservative	David Westley	1167	59.9%	
Labour	Paul Hennessy	781	41.1%	
Majority		386		
Turnout		1967	43.74%	
Conservative hold		Swing		

=== Aughton Park ===
Aughton Park
Party	Candidate	Votes	%	±%
Conservative	Graham Jones	970	69.7%	
Labour	Margaret Blake	422	30.3%	
Majority		548		
Turnout		1402	44.48%	
Conservative hold		Swing		

=== Bickerstaffe ===
Bickerstaffe
Party	Candidate	Votes	%	±%
Conservative	David Griffiths	444	56.1%	
Labour	Kerry Lloyd	374	43.9%	
Majority		70		
Turnout		820	46.67%	

=== Birch Green ===
Birch Green
Party	Candidate	Votes	%	±%
Labour	Neil Pye	789	88.3%	
Conservative	Craig McCann	105	11.7%	
Majority		684		
Turnout		912	29.58%	
Labour hold		Swing		

=== Derby ===
Derby
Party	Candidate	Votes	%	±%
Conservative	David Sudworth	1002	52.9%	
Labour	Lucy Hodson	764	35.6%	
Green	Anne Doyle	219	11.6%	
Majority		238		
Turnout		1996	36.41%	
Conservative hold		Swing		

=== Digmoor ===
Digmoor
Party	Candidate	Votes	%	±%
Labour	Jacqueline Coyle	888	85.2%	
Conservative	Ryan Waite	108	10.4%	
Liberal Democrats	Peter Finnigan	46	4.4%	
Majority		780		
Turnout		1053	33.73%	
Labour hold		Swing		

=== Knowsley ===
Knowsley
Party	Candidate	Votes	%	±%
Conservative	Robert Bailey	964	48.3%	
Labour	Gail Hodson	820	41.1%	
Green	John Watt	210	10.5%	
Majority		144		
Turnout		2001	45.36%	
Conservative hold		Swing		

=== North Meols ===
North Meols
Party	Candidate	Votes	%	±%
Conservative	Paul Blane	785	65.0%	
Labour	Joan Draper	422	35.0%	
Majority		363		
Turnout		1219	37.62%	
Conservative hold		Swing		

=== Parbold ===
Parbold
Party	Candidate	Votes	%	±%
Conservative	May Blake	1062	67.9%	
Labour	Clare Gillard	502	32.1%	
Majority		560		
Turnout		1579	50.46%	
Conservative hold		Swing		

=== Rufford ===
Rufford
Party	Candidate	Votes	%	±%
Conservative	Jane Houlgrave	372	42.8%	
Independent	John Gordon	261	30.0%	
Labour	Robert Watkinson	236	27.2%	
Majority		111		
Turnout		876	52.49%	
Conservative hold		Swing		

=== Scarisbrick ===
Scarisbrick
Party	Candidate	Votes	%	±%
Conservative	Andrew Fowler	867	66.8%	
Labour	Susan Jones	431	33.2%	
Majority		436		
Turnout		1319	43.78%	

=== Scott ===
Scott
Party	Candidate	Votes	%	±%
Labour	John Hodson	905	46.1%	
Conservative	David Meadows	754	38.4%	
Green	Maurice George	166	8.4%	
Liberal Democrats	Peter Banks	140	7.1%	
Majority		151		
Turnout		1980	43.82%	

=== Skelmersdale North ===
Skelmersdale North
Party	Candidate	Votes	%	±%
Labour	Richard Barry	950	85.0%	
Conservative	Amanda Shaw	168	15.0%	
Majority		782		
Turnout		1128	36.43%	
Labour hold		Swing		

=== Skelmersdale South ===
Skelmersdale South
Party	Candidate	Votes	%	±%
Labour	Nicola Pryce-Roberts	1187	71.2%	
Conservative	Sarah Ainscough	358	21.5%	
Green	Martin Lowe	121	7.3%	
Majority		829		
Turnout		1678	33.19%	
Labour hold		Swing		

=== Tanhouse ===
Tanhouse
Party	Candidate	Votes	%	±%
Labour	Nicola Hennessy	726	79.5%	
Conservative	Irene O'Donnell	187	20.5%	
Majority		539		
Turnout		924	27.16%	
Labour hold		Swing		

=== Tarleton ===
Tarleton
Party	Candidate	Votes	%	±%
Conservative	Andrew Cheetham	1393	68.7%	
Labour	Roy Hiscock	634	31.3%	
Majority		759		
Turnout		2052	45.38%	
Conservative hold		Swing		

=== Up Holland ===
Up Holland
Party	Candidate	Votes	%	±%
Labour	John Fillis	1127	56.7%	
Conservative	Carolyn Evans	743	37.4%	
Liberal Democrats	Jason Hutton	117	5.9%	
Majority		384		
Turnout		2002	40.36%	
Labour hold		Swing		

=== Wrightington ===
Wrightington
Party	Candidate	Votes	%	±%
Conservative	Pam Baybutt	951	65.1%	
Labour	Tom Unsworth	510	34.9%	
Majority		441		
Turnout		1486	43.48%	
