= 2023 West Lancashire election =

2023 West Lancashire election may refer to:

- 2023 West Lancashire Borough Council election, local election
- 2023 West Lancashire by-election, parliamentary election
