= 2018 West Lancashire Borough Council election =

2018 UK local government election

Results of the 2018 West Lancashire Borough Council election

The 2018 West Lancashire Borough Council election took place on 3 May 2018 to elect West Lancashire Borough Council members in England. This was on the same day as other local elections. Labour retained control of the council, while gaining two seats from the Conservatives, with localist party Our West Lancashire gaining one seat in Derby from the Conservatives.

== Election result ==
West Lancashire local election result 2018
| Party | Seats | Gains | Losses | Net gain/loss | Seats % | Votes % | Votes | +/− |
|---|---|---|---|---|---|---|---|---|
| Labour | 10 | 2 | 0 | ▲2 | 55.6 | 50.5 | 12,436 | ▲7.5 |
| Conservative | 7 | 0 | 3 | ▼3 | 38.9 | 40.1 | 9,890 | ▲2.5 |
| OWL | 1 | 1 | 0 | ▲1 | 5.6 | 8.2 | 2,010 | New |
| Green | 0 | 0 | 0 | Steady | 0.0 | 0.8 | 203 | ▼2.6 |
| Liberal Democrats | 0 | 0 | 0 | Steady | 0.0 | 0.4 | 97 | ▲0.1 |

== Ward results ==
=== Ashurst ===
Ashurst
| Party | Candidate | Votes | % | ±% |
|---|---|---|---|---|
| Labour | Yvonne Gagen | 1,041 | 74.7 | ▲11.2 |
| Conservative | Jane Houlgrave | 221 | 15.9 | ▲6.3 |
| Green | William Gilmour | 132 | 9.5 | New |
| Majority | | 820 | 58.8 | ▲22.2 |
| Turnout | | 1,397 | 30.0 | ▼1.3 |
| Labour hold | | Swing | | |

=== Aughton and Downholland ===
Aughton and Downholland
| Party | Candidate | Votes | % | ±% |
|---|---|---|---|---|
| Conservative | David O'Toole | 919 | 55.7 | ▲13.0 |
| Labour | Stephen Kirrelly | 730 | 44.3 | ▲13.0 |
| Majority | | 189 | 11.4 | Steady |
| Turnout | | 1,663 | 36.8 | ▼1.7 |
| Conservative hold | | Swing | | |

=== Aughton Park ===
Aughton Park
| Party | Candidate | Votes | % | ±% |
|---|---|---|---|---|
| Conservative | Doreen Stephenson | 752 | 62.9 | ▲22.8 |
| Labour | Bernie Green | 443 | 37.1 | ▲7.8 |
| Majority | | 309 | 25.8 | ▲16.3 |
| Turnout | | 1,199 | 37.7 | ▲0.4 |
| Conservative hold | | Swing | | |

=== Burscough East ===
Burscough East
| Party | Candidate | Votes | % | ±% |
|---|---|---|---|---|
| Labour | Susan Evans | 710 | 51.1 | ▲15.4 |
| Conservative | Ruth Melling | 679 | 48.9 | ▲3.1 |
| Majority | | 31 | 2.2 | N/A |
| Turnout | | 1,396 | 39.8 | ▼2.6 |
| Labour gain from Conservative | | Swing | | |

=== Burscough West ===
Burscough West
| Party | Candidate | Votes | % | ±% |
|---|---|---|---|---|
| Labour | Cynthia Dereli | 965 | 65.7 | ▲15.3 |
| Conservative | Gillian Taylor | 503 | 34.3 | ▲6.1 |
| Majority | | 462 | 31.4 | ▲9.2 |
| Turnout | | 1,473 | 38.1 | ▼2.3 |
| Labour hold | | Swing | | |

=== Derby ===
Derby
| Party | Candidate | Votes | % | ±% |
|---|---|---|---|---|
| OWL | Ian Davis | 884 | 46.9 | New |
| Labour | Gareth Dowling | 710 | 37.6 | ▲2.4 |
| Conservative | Lynne Gray | 221 | 11.7 | ▼38.4 |
| Green | Heather Doyle | 71 | 3.8 | ▼10.9 |
| Majority | | 174 | 9.3 | N/A |
| Turnout | | 1,891 | 34.7 | ▲6.1 |
| OWL gain from Conservative | | Swing | | |

=== Hesketh-with-Becconsall ===
Hesketh-with-Becconsall
| Party | Candidate | Votes | % | ±% |
|---|---|---|---|---|
| Conservative | Christopher Ashcroft | 622 | 59.8 | ▼7.7 |
| Labour | Nick Kemp | 322 | 30.9 | ▼1.6 |
| Liberal Democrats | Tina Stringfellow | 97 | 9.3 | New |
| Majority | | 300 | 28.9 | ▼6.1 |
| Turnout | | 1,046 | 32.0 | ▼3.0 |
| Conservative hold | | Swing | | |

=== Knowsley ===
Knowsley
| Party | Candidate | Votes | % | ±% |
|---|---|---|---|---|
| Labour | Michelle Aldridge | 1,014 | 50.9 | ▲5.7 |
| Conservative | Jeffrey Vernon | 673 | 33.8 | ▼10.0 |
| OWL | Kate Mitchell | 306 | 15.4 | New |
| Majority | | 341 | 17.1 | ▲15.7 |
| Turnout | | 1,998 | 43.5 | ▼1.1 |
| Labour hold | | Swing | | |

=== Moorside ===
Moorside
| Party | Candidate | Votes | % | ±% |
|---|---|---|---|---|
| Labour | Terry Devine | 668 | 88.8 | ▼1.7 |
| Conservative | Sarah Westley | 84 | 11.2 | ▲1.7 |
| Majority | | 584 | 77.6 | ▼3.4 |
| Turnout | | 757 | 28.6 | ▼0.6 |
| Labour hold | | Swing | | |

=== Newburgh ===
Newburgh
| Party | Candidate | Votes | % | ±% |
|---|---|---|---|---|
| Conservative | Eddie Pope | 476 | 74.6 | ▲14.9 |
| Labour | Julian Finch | 162 | 25.4 | ▲1.7 |
| Majority | | 314 | 49.2 | ▲13.2 |
| Turnout | | 643 | 39.2 | ▼2.6 |
| Conservative hold | | Swing | | |

=== North Meols ===
North Meols
| Party | Candidate | Votes | % | ±% |
|---|---|---|---|---|
| Labour | Kath Lockie | 625 | 55.4 | ▲29.8 |
| Conservative | George Rear | 503 | 44.6 | ▲4.0 |
| Majority | | 122 | 10.8 | N/A |
| Turnout | | 1,132 | 32.1 | ▼0.8 |
| Labour gain from Conservative | | Swing | | |

=== Parbold ===
Parbold
| Party | Candidate | Votes | % | ±% |
|---|---|---|---|---|
| Conservative | David Whittington | 861 | 65.1 | ▲11.2 |
| Labour | Clare Gillard | 461 | 34.9 | ▲5.8 |
| Majority | | 400 | 30.2 | ▲5.4 |
| Turnout | | 1,333 | 43.8 | ▲2.0 |
| Conservative hold | | Swing | | |

=== Scarisbrick ===
Scarisbrick
| Party | Candidate | Votes | % | ±% |
|---|---|---|---|---|
| Conservative | Jane Marshall | 793 | 69.1 | ▲2.8 |
| Labour | Claire Bowen | 354 | 30.9 | ▼2.8 |
| Majority | | 439 | 38.2 | ▲5.6 |
| Turnout | | 1,151 | 38.2 | ▼0.5 |
| Conservative hold | | Swing | | |

=== Scott ===
Scott
| Party | Candidate | Votes | % | ±% |
|---|---|---|---|---|
| Labour | Noel Delaney | 850 | 45.4 | ▼6.0 |
| OWL | Jane Thompson | 820 | 43.8 | New |
| Conservative | George Pratt | 201 | 10.7 | ▼21.0 |
| Majority | | 30 | 1.6 | ▼18.1 |
| Turnout | | 1,876 | 42.3 | ▲4.6 |
| Labour hold | | Swing | | |

=== Skelmersdale South ===
Skelmersdale South
| Party | Candidate | Votes | % | ±% |
|---|---|---|---|---|
| Labour | Vickie Cummins | 1,126 | 81.2 | ▲18.9 |
| Conservative | Valerie Marsh | 260 | 18.8 | ▲11.3 |
| Majority | | 866 | 62.4 | ▲24.4 |
| Turnout | | 1,390 | 29.0 | ▼3.2 |
| Labour hold | | Swing | | |

=== Tanhouse ===
Tanhouse
| Party | Candidate | Votes | % | ±% |
|---|---|---|---|---|
| Labour | Bob Pendleton | 714 | 85.1 | ▲5.5 |
| Conservative | Susan Janvier | 125 | 14.9 | ▲7.1 |
| Majority | | 589 | 70.2 | ▲3.3 |
| Turnout | | 844 | 24.6 | ▼1.9 |
| Labour hold | | Swing | | |

=== Tarleton ===
Tarleton
| Party | Candidate | Votes | % | ±% |
|---|---|---|---|---|
| Conservative | John Mee | 1,179 | 68.9 | ▲15.2 |
| Labour | Freddie Hodson | 531 | 31.1 | ▲13.8 |
| Majority | | 648 | 37.8 | N/A |
| Turnout | | 1,727 | 36.4 | ▼1.2 |
| Conservative hold | | Swing | | |

=== Up Holland ===
Up Holland
| Party | Candidate | Votes | % | ±% |
|---|---|---|---|---|
| Labour | Ian Moran | 1,010 | 55.3 | ▲2.5 |
| Conservative | David Marsh | 818 | 44.7 | ▲22.2 |
| Majority | | 192 | 10.6 | ▼17.5 |
| Turnout | | 1,841 | 36.7 | ▼0.1 |
| Labour hold | | Swing | | |
