= 2022 West Lancashire Borough Council election =

2022 UK local government election

← 2021	5 May 2022	2023 →

20 out of 54 seats to West Lancashire Borough Council 28 seats needed for a majority

	First party	Second party
Party	Labour	Conservative
Last election	26 seats, 42.9%	20 seats, 35.1%
Seats won	11	8
Seats after	26	20
Seat change	Steady	Steady
Popular vote	13,310	9,215
Percentage	50.9%	35.2%
Swing	▲8.0%	▲0.1%
	Third party	Fourth party
Party	OWL	Independent
Last election	7 seats, 8.9%	1 seat, 5.5%
Seats won	1	0
Seats after	7	1
Seat change	Steady	Steady
Popular vote	3,164	0
Percentage	12.1%	0.0%
Swing	▲3.2%	▼5.5%
- Winner of each seat at the 2022 West Lancashire Borough Council election
Council control before election
No overall control
Council control after election
No overall control

The 2022 West Lancashire Borough Council election took place on 5 May 2022 to elect members of West Lancashire Borough Council in Lancashire, England.

== Results summary ==
2022 West Lancashire Borough Council election
Party	This election			Full council			This election		
Party	Seats	Net	Seats %	Other	Total	Total %	Votes	Votes %	+/−
Labour	11	Steady	55.0	15	26	48.1	13,310	50.9	+8.0
Conservative	8	Steady	40.0	12	20	37.0	9,215	35.2	+0.1
OWL	1	Steady	5.0	6	7	13.0	3,164	12.1	+3.2
Independent	0	Steady	0.0	1	1	1.9	N/A	N/A	-5.5
Liberal Democrats	0	Steady	0.0	0	0	0.0	475	1.8	-1.3

== Ward results ==
=== Ashurst ===
Ashurst
Party	Candidate	Votes	%	±%
Labour	Yvonne Gagen	1,121	81	
Conservative	George Rear	166	12	
Liberal Democrats	Peter Chandler	98	7	
Majority			69	
Turnout			27	
Labour hold		Swing		

=== Aughton and Downholland ===
Aughton and Downholland
Party	Candidate	Votes	%	±%
Conservative	David O'Toole	825	48	+1.8
Labour	Paul Hennessy	763	44	+10.9
Liberal Democrats	Dermot O'Hara	131	8	+0.5
Majority		62	4	−9.1
Turnout			38	
Conservative hold		Swing		

=== Aughton Park ===
Aughton Park
Party	Candidate	Votes	%	±%
Labour Co-op	Rob Molloy	596	51	
Conservative	Doreen Stephenson	577	49	
Majority		19	2	
Turnout			37	
Labour Co-op gain from Conservative		Swing		

=== Burscough East ===
Burscough East (2 seats)
Party	Candidate	Votes	%	±%
Labour	Patricia Burnside	695	53	
Labour	Damian Owen	632	49	
Conservative	Julie Baxter	495	38	
Conservative	Jason Grice	476	37	
Liberal Democrats	Neil Pollington	125	10	
Majority				
Turnout			36.93	
Labour hold		Swing		
Labour hold		Swing		

=== Burscough West ===
Burscough West
Party	Candidate	Votes	%	±%
Labour	Andy Fowler	664	46	
OWL	Alexander William Dow	538	37	
Conservative	George Ernest Pratt	251	17	
Majority			9	
Turnout		1453	36.6	
Labour hold		Swing		

=== Derby ===
Derby
Party	Candidate	Votes	%	±%
OWL	Ian Davis	803	46	
Labour Co-op	Nikki Hennessy	739	42	
Conservative	Gillian Taylor	145	8	
Liberal Democrats	Callum Clark	62	4	
Majority		64	4	
Turnout			32	
OWL hold		Swing		

=== Hesketh with Becconsall ===
Hesketh with Becconsall
Party	Candidate	Votes	%	±%
Conservative	Ian Eccles	618	59	
Labour	Melissa Parlour	431	41	
Majority			18	
Turnout			32	
Conservative hold		Swing		

=== Knowsley ===
Knowsley
Party	Candidate	Votes	%	±%
Labour Co-op	Gareth Dowling	970	50	
OWL	Janet Ingman	747	39	
Conservative	Julie Peel	204	11	
Majority				
Turnout			41	
Labour Co-op hold		Swing		

=== Moorside ===
Moorside
Party	Candidate	Votes	%	±%
Labour	John Fillis	536	87	
Conservative	Susan Brake	81	13	
Majority				
Turnout			24	
Labour hold		Swing		

=== Newburgh ===
Newburgh
Party	Candidate	Votes	%	±%
Conservative	Eddie Pope	490	69	
Labour	John Tribe	218	31	
Majority				
Turnout			44	
Conservative hold		Swing		

=== North Meols ===
North Meols
Party	Candidate	Votes	%	±%
Conservative	Linda Gresty	680	59	
Labour	Tony Lockie	408	36	
Liberal Democrats	Karen Taylor	59	5	
Majority				
Turnout			32	
Conservative gain from Labour		Swing		

=== Parbold ===
Parbold
Party	Candidate	Votes	%	±%
Conservative	David Whittington	760	60	
Labour	Margaret Blake	504	40	
Majority			20	
Turnout			42	
Conservative hold		Swing		

=== Scarisbrick ===
Scarisbrick
Party	Candidate	Votes	%	±%
Conservative	Jane Marshall	663	62	
Labour Co-op	George Oliver	404	38	
Majority			24	
Turnout			35	
Conservative hold		Swing		

=== Scott ===
Scott
Party	Candidate	Votes	%	±%
Labour	Mark Anderson	896	51	
OWL	Neil Pye	689	39	
Conservative	Ruth Melling	183	10	
Majority		207	12	
Turnout			37	
Labour hold		Swing		

=== Skelmersdale South ===
Skelmersdale South
Party	Candidate	Votes	%	±%
Labour Co-op	Vickie Cummins	867	73	
OWL	Joy Balan	191	16	
Conservative	Jayne Rear	137	11	
Majority				
Turnout			25	
Labour Co-op hold		Swing		

=== Tanhouse ===
Tanhouse
Party	Candidate	Votes	%	±%
Labour	Paul Hogan	649	86	
Conservative	Susan Janvier	108	14	
Majority				
Turnout			22	
Labour hold		Swing		

=== Tarleton ===
Tarleton
Party	Candidate	Votes	%	±%
Conservative	John Mee	1,096	58	
Labour	Chris Houlihan	584	31	
Liberal Democrats	Tina Maria Stringfellow	196	10	
Majority				
Turnout			39	
Conservative hold		Swing		

=== Up Holland ===
Up Holland
Party	Candidate	Votes	%	±%
Labour	Suresh Patel	1,032	64	
Conservative	Alexander Holcroft	573	36	
Majority				
Turnout			32	
Labour hold		Swing		

=== Wrightington ===
Wrightington
Party	Candidate	Votes	%	±%
Conservative	Robert Bailey	687	53	
Labour	Catherine West-McGrath	601	47	
Majority		86	6	
Turnout			39	
Conservative hold		Swing		
