= 2019 West Lancashire Borough Council election =

List of local UK elections

Results of the 2019 West Lancashire Borough Council election

The 2019 West Lancashire Borough Council election took place on 2 May 2019 to elect members of West Lancashire Borough Council.

== Results summary ==
2019 West Lancashire Borough Council election
Party	This election				Full council			This election		
Party	Candidates	Seats	Net	Seats %	Other	Total	Total %	Votes	Votes %	+/−
Labour	{{{candidates}}}	7	▼4	38.9	22	29	53.7	8,824	38.8	
Conservative	{{{candidates}}}	7	Steady	38.9	12	19	35.2	7,531	33.1	
OWL	{{{candidates}}}	4	▲4	22.2	2	6	11.1	3,772	16.6	
Skelmersdale Independent Party	{{{candidates}}}	0	Steady	0.0	0	0	0.0	1,656	7.3	
Green	{{{candidates}}}	0	Steady	0.0	0	0	0.0	827	3.6	
UKIP	{{{candidates}}}	0	Steady	0.0	0	0	0.0	152	0.7	
Independent	{{{candidates}}}	0	Steady	0.0	0	0	0.0	47	0.3	

== Ward results ==
OWL = Our West Lancashire

=== Ashurst ===
Ashurst
Party	Candidate	Votes	%	±%
Labour	Jan Monaghan	744	54.9	
Skelmersdale Independent Party	Rebekha Wymer	350	25.8	
Green	William Gilmour	155	11.4	
Conservative	George Rear	107	7.9	
Majority				
Turnout		1,356	29.0	
Labour hold		Swing		

=== Aughton & Downholland ===
Aughton & Downholland
Party	Candidate	Votes	%	±%
Conservative	David Westley	861	53.1	
Labour	Paul Hennessy	480	29.6	
Green	Gaynor Pickering	280	17.3	
Majority				
Turnout		1,621	36.0	
Conservative hold		Swing		

=== Aughton Park ===
Aughton Park
Party	Candidate	Votes	%	±%
Conservative	Marilyn Westley	741	67.9	
Labour	Stephen Regan	351	32.1	
Majority				
Turnout		1,092	35.0	
Conservative hold		Swing		

=== Bickerstaffe ===
Bickerstaffe
Party	Candidate	Votes	%	±%
OWL	Ian Rigby	540	67.4	
Conservative	Jeff Vernon	145	18.1	
Labour	Paul Dickie	116	14.5	
Majority				
Turnout		801	46.0	
OWL gain from Labour		Swing		

=== Birch Green ===
Birch Green
Party	Candidate	Votes	%	±%
Labour	Carl Coughlan	463	58.6	
Skelmersdale Independent Party	Andrew Taylor	277	35.1	
Conservative	Jane Houlgrave	50	6.3	
Majority				
Turnout		790	27.0	
Labour hold		Swing		

=== Derby ===
Derby
Party	Candidate	Votes	%	±%
OWL	Gordon Johnson	1,044	64.0	
Labour	George Francis	427	26.2	
Conservative	Lynne Gray	160	9.8	
Majority				
Turnout		1,631	36.0	
OWL gain from Labour		Swing		

=== Digmoor ===
Digmoor
Party	Candidate	Votes	%	±%
Labour	Julian Finch	432	50.3	
Skelmersdale Independent Party	Brian Hughes	385	44.9	
Conservative	Sue Janvier	41	4.8	
Majority				
Turnout		858	28.0	
Labour hold		Swing		

=== Knowsley ===
Knowsley
Party	Candidate	Votes	%	±%
OWL	Kate Mitchell	804	42.3	
Labour Co-op	Nikki Hennessy	684	36.0	
Conservative	Ruth Melling	303	15.9	
Green	John Watt	110	5.8	
Majority				
Turnout		1,901	43.0	
OWL gain from Labour		Swing		

=== North Meols ===
North Meols
Party	Candidate	Votes	%	±%
Conservative	Tom Blane	595	49.3	
Labour	Nick Kemp	459	38.1	
UKIP	Stuart Wilson	152	12.6	
Majority				
Turnout		1,206	34.0	
Conservative hold		Swing		

=== Parbold ===
Parbold
Party	Candidate	Votes	%	±%
Conservative	May Blake	882	68.7	
Labour	Isaac Brewer	402	31.3	
Majority				
Turnout		1,284	43.0	
Conservative hold		Swing		

=== Scarisbrick ===
Scarisbrick
Party	Candidate	Votes	%	±%
Conservative	Alexander Blundell	617	65.3	
Labour	Timothy Miles	328	34.7	
Majority				
Turnout		945	33.0	
Conservative hold		Swing		

=== Scott ===
Scott
Party	Candidate	Votes	%	±%
OWL	Jane Thompson	945	57.8	
Labour	Samantha Jones	562	34.4	
Conservative	George Pratt	128	7.8	
Majority				
Turnout		1,635	38.0	
OWL gain from Labour		Swing		

=== Skelmersdale North ===
Skelmersdale North
Party	Candidate	Votes	%	±%
Labour	Jennifer Forshaw	486	55.5	
Skelmersdale Independent Party	Maria Dumbell	320	36.5	
Conservative	Malcolm Barron	70	8.0	
Majority				
Turnout		876	30.0	
Labour hold		Swing		

=== Skelmersdale South ===
Skelmersdale South
Party	Candidate	Votes	%	±%
Labour	Nicola Roberts	719	56.1	
OWL	Blair Piggin	439	34.3	
Conservative	Jayne Rear	123	9.6	
Majority				
Turnout		1,281	27.0	
Labour hold		Swing		

=== Tanhouse ===
Tanhouse
Party	Candidate	Votes	%	±%
Labour	Maureen Nixon	468	55.6	
Skelmersdale Independent Party	Aaron Body	277	32.9	
Conservative	Sarah Westley	50	5.9	
Independent	Alan Langdon	47	5.6	
Majority				
Turnout		842	24.0	
Labour hold		Swing		

=== Tarleton ===
Tarleton
Party	Candidate	Votes	%	±%
Conservative	Anne Sutton	1,369	75.6	
Labour	Peter Langley	443	24.4	
Majority				
Turnout		1,812	39.0	
Conservative hold		Swing		

=== Up Holland ===
Up Holland
Party	Candidate	Votes	%	±%
Labour	Paul O'Neill	919	58.1	
Conservative	Jack Gilmore	662	41.9	
Majority				
Turnout		1,581	33.0	
Labour hold		Swing		

=== Wrightington ===
Wrightington
Party	Candidate	Votes	%	±%
Conservative	Pam Baybutt	627	50.2	
Labour	Bernie Green	341	27.3	
Green	John Puddifer	282	22.6	
Majority				
Turnout		1,250	38.0	
Conservative hold		Swing		
