= 2016 West Lancashire Borough Council election =

2016 UK local government election

Results of the 2016 West Lancashire Borough Council election

The 2016 West Lancashire Borough Council election took place on 5 May 2016 to elect members of West Lancashire Borough Council in Lancashire, England. Following the 2015 local elections the Labour Party took control of the council. A third of the seats were being polled during this election. Summary post election-

Political Composition after election: Conservative (Leader Councillor David Westley) 22 seats; Labour (Leader Councillor Ian Moran) 31 seats and Our West Lancashire 1 seat.

== By ward ==
=== Ashurst ===
Ashurst
Party	Candidate	Votes	%	±%
Labour	Gail Pamela Hodson	1011	72.3%	
Green	William Mason Rowan Gilmour	220	15.7%	
Conservative	David Jonathan Griffiths	168	12.0%	
Majority		791		
Turnout		1416	30.3%	

=== Aughton and Downholland ===
Aughton and Downholland
Party	Candidate	Votes	%	±%
Conservative	Sam Currie	952	58.1%	
Labour	Thomas George Phillips	686	41.9%	
Majority		266		
Turnout		1657	36.1%	

=== Birch Green ===
Birch Green
Party	Candidate	Votes	%	±%
Labour	Claire Louise Cooper	662	88.9%	
Conservative	William John Weingart	83	11.1%	
Majority		579		
Turnout		751	25.7%	

=== Burscough East ===
Burscough East
Party	Candidate	Votes	%	±%
Labour	David Evans	760	58.4%	
Conservative	Robert Bailey	541	41.6%	
Majority		219		
Turnout		1322	38.7%	

=== Burscough West ===
Burscough West
Party	Candidate	Votes	%	±%
Labour	Andrew John Pritchard	912	62.7%	
Conservative	Leon Graham	542	37.3%	
Majority		370		
Turnout		1466	38.5%	

=== Derby ===
Derby
Party	Candidate	Votes	%	±%
Our West Lancashire	Adrian Edward Owens	806	41.8%	
Labour	Liam David Blacklock	710	36.8%	
Conservative	Thomas Burton	339	17.6%	
Green	Heather Doyle	72	3.7%	
Majority		96		
Turnout		1936	38.4%	

=== Digmoor ===
Digmoor
Party	Candidate	Votes	%	±%
Labour	Kevin William Henry Wilkie	784	92.6%	
Conservative	Richard Henry Shepherd	63	7.4%	
Majority		721		
Turnout		870	29.1%	

=== Halsall ===
Halsall
Party	Candidate	Votes	%	±%
Labour	Maureen Kathleen Patricia Mills	313	43.5%	
Conservative	Doreen Joan Stephenson	289	40.1%	
UKIP	John Stewart Simpson Stewart	118	16.4%	
Majority		24		
Turnout		725	42.3%	

=== Hesketh-with-Becconsall ===
Hesketh-with-Becconsall
Party	Candidate	Votes	%	±%
Conservative	Paul Moon	578	63.4%	
Labour	Sally Josephine Hodson	333	36.6%	
Majority		245		
Turnout		930	29.1%	

=== Knowsley ===
Knowsley
Party	Candidate	Votes	%	±%
Labour	Adam Gerard Yates	1063	51.5%	
Conservative	Edward James McCarthy	744	36.0%	
Our West Lancashire	Peter Banks	174	8.4%	
Green	Gaynor Anne Pickering	85	4.1%	
Majority		319		
Turnout		2074	45.7%	

=== Moorside ===
Moorside
Party	Candidate	Votes	%	±%
Labour	Terence Aldridge	725	91.2%	
Conservative	George Ernest Pratt	70	8.8%	
Majority		655		
Turnout		802	30.8%	

=== Rufford ===
Rufford
Party	Candidate	Votes	%	±%
Conservative	John Ian Gordon	472	71.5%	
Labour	Natalie June McCulloch	188	28.5%	
Majority		284		
Turnout		671	40.4%	

=== Scott ===
Scott
Party	Candidate	Votes	%	±%
Labour	Kevin John Wright	770	43.0%	
Our West Lancashire	Jane Thompson	640	35.7%	
Conservative	David John Meadows	300	16.7%	
Green	Maurice Henry George	82	4.6%	
Majority		130		
Turnout		1797	41.9%	

=== Skelmersdale North ===
Skelmersdale North
Party	Candidate	Votes	%	±%
Labour	Neil Stuart Furey	856	89.7%	
Conservative	Susan Ingrid Janvier	98	10.3%	
Majority		758		
Turnout		963	32.6%	

=== Skelmersdale South ===
Skelmersdale South
Party	Candidate	Votes	%	±%
Labour	Donna Marie Eileen West	1099	81.3%	
Conservative	Jenni Mayer	138	10.2%	
Green	Martin John Lowe	115	8.5%	
Majority		961		
Turnout		1360	28.6%	

=== Tarleton ===
Tarleton
Party	Candidate	Votes	%	±%
Conservative	John Philip Cairns	1077	67.4%	
Labour	Frederick Andrew Hodson	522	32.6%	
Majority		555		
Turnout		1632	35.7%	

=== Up Holland ===
Up Holland
Party	Candidate	Votes	%	±%
Labour	Gaynar Owen	1113	67.8%	
Conservative	Jane Houlgrave	529	32.2%	
Majority		584		
Turnout		1655	33.6%	

=== Wrightington ===
Wrightington
Party	Candidate	Votes	%	±%
Conservative	Carolyn Evans	668	53.5%	
Labour	Bernadette Green	432	34.6%	
Green	Julie Hotchkiss	148	11.9%	
Majority		236		
Turnout		1256	37.9%	
