= 1998 West Lancashire District Council election =

Local council election in Lancashire, England

The 1998 West Lancashire District Council election took place on 7 May 1998 to elect members of West Lancashire District Council in Lancashire, England. One third of the council was up for election and the Labour Party stayed in overall control of the council.

After the election, the composition of the council was:

| Party | Seats | ± |
|---|---|---|
| Labour | 32 | -3 |
| Conservative | 20 | +1 |
| Independent | 2 | +1 |
| Others | 1 | +1 |

== Election result ==
West Lancashire local election result 1998
| Party | Seats | Gains | Losses | Net gain/loss | Seats % | Votes % | Votes | +/− |
|---|---|---|---|---|---|---|---|---|
| Labour | 9 | | | -3 | 47.4 | | | |
| Conservative | 8 | | | +1 | 42.1 | | | |
| Independent | 1 | | | +1 | 5.3 | | | |
| Others | 1 | | | +1 | 5.3 | | | |
