= 2026 West Lancashire Borough Council election =

2026 English local government election

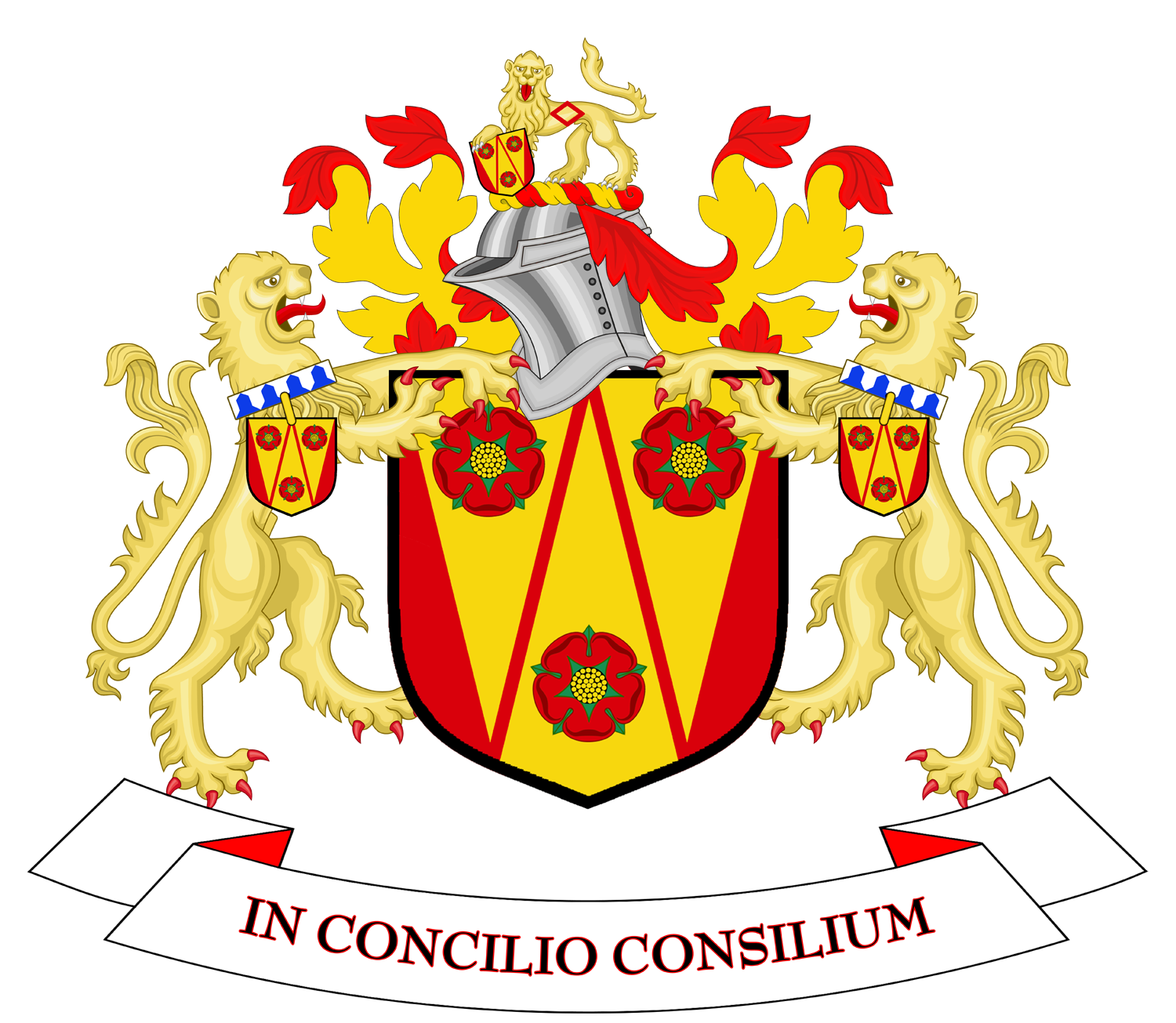
- 7 May 2026

15 out of 45 seats to West Lancashire Borough Council 23 seats needed for a majority
- Registered: 88,449
- Turnout: 36,460; 41.2%
	First party	Second party	Third party
Leader	Yvonne Gagen (retiring)	Adrian Owens	David Whittington
Party	Labour Co-op	OWL	Conservative
Last election	26 seats, 46.5%	5 seats 16.9%	14 seats 26.2%
Seats before	21	7	14
Seats won	0	5	3
Seats after	13	11	12
Seat change	▼9	▲4	▼2
Popular vote	6,304	6,800	6,289
Percentage	17.3%	18.7%	17.3%
Swing	▼29.0%	▲1.9%	▼8.8%
	Fourth party	Fifth party	Sixth party
Party	Reform	Independent	Your Party
Last election	0 seats 1.2%	Did not stand	Did not exist
Seats before	0	2	1
Seats won	7	0	0
Seats after	7	2	0
Seat change	▲7	Steady	▼1
Popular vote	11,650	Did not stand	450
Percentage	32.0%	Did not stand	1.2%
Swing	▲30.9%	N/A	N/A
- Results of the 2026 West Lancashire Council election
Leader before election
Yvonne Gagen
Labour Co-op
No overall control (Note: Labour minority.)
Leader after election
David Whittington
Conservative
No overall control (Note: Conservative–OWL coalition.)

The 2026 West Lancashire Borough Council election was held on 7 May 2026, alongside the other local elections across the United Kingdom being held on the same day, to elect 16 of 48 members of West Lancashire Borough Council in Lancashire, England.

Prior to the election, the council was under no overall control. Labour was the largest party and ran the council as a minority administration. At this election, the council remained under no overall control. Labour won none of the seats being contested at this election. They narrowly remained the largest party, with 13 seats, closely followed by the Conservatives with 12 seats and local party Our West Lancashire with 11 seats. After the election, the Conservatives and Our West Lancashire formed a coalition administration. The Conservative group leader, David Whittington, was formally appointed as the new leader of the council at the subsequent annual council meeting on 20 May 2026.

== Summary ==
=== Background ===
In 2024, the Labour Party retained majority control of the council. In January 2026, the council asked for the election to be postponed pending local government reorganisation. However it was rescheduled on 16 February 2026.

=== Council composition ===
After 2024 election		Before 2026 election	
Party	Seats	Party	Seats
Labour	26	Labour	21
Conservative	14	Conservative	14
OWL	5	OWL	7
Your Party	Not formed	Your Party	1
Independent	0	Independent	2

Changes 2024–2026:

- September 2024: Neil Furey (Labour), Paul Hogan (Labour), and Kerry Lloyd (Labour) leave party to sit as independents
- May 2025:
  - Neil Furey (Independent) joins OWL
  - Nikki Hennessy (Labour) leaves party to sit as an independent
- August 2025: Kerry Lloyd (Independent) resigns – by-election held October 2025
- October 2025:
  - Gordon Johnson (OWL) gains by-election from Labour
  - Paul Hogan (Independent) joins Your Party
- November 2025: Julian Finch (Labour) leaves party to sit as an independent

=== Election result ===
2026 West Lancashire Borough Council election
Party	This election				Full council			This election		
Party	Candidates	Seats	Net	Seats %	Other	Total	Total %	Votes	Votes %	+/−
Labour Co-op	15	0	▼9	0.0	13	13	28.8	6,304	17.3	–29.0
Conservative	15	3	▼2	20.0	9	12	26.6	6,289	17.3	–8.8
OWL	8	5	▲4	33.3	6	11	24.4	6,800	18.7	+1.9
Reform	15	7	▲7	46.6	0	7	15.5	11,650	32.0	+30.9
Independent	0	0	Steady	0.0	2	2	4.4	N/A (Note: Did not stand candidates.)	N/A	N/A
Green	15	0	Steady	0.0	0	0	0.0	4,150	11.4	+4.9
Liberal Democrats	7	0	Steady	0.0	0	0	0.0	737	2.0	–0.7
Your Party	2	0	▼1	0.0	0	0	0.0	450	1.2	N/A

== Incumbents ==
Ward	Incumbent councillor	Party	Re-standing
Aughton & Holborn	Sarah Lawton	Labour Co-op	No
Burscough Bridge & Rufford	Edward Pope	Conservative	Yes
Burscough Town	Andy Fowler	Labour Co-op	Yes
North Meols & Hesketh Bank	Thomas de Freitas	Conservative	Yes
Old Skelmersdale	Nicola Pryce-Roberts	Labour	No
Ormskirk East	Rob Molloy	Labour Co-op	No
Ormskirk West	Gareth Dowling	Labour Co-op	Yes
Rural North East	Katie Juckes	Conservative	Yes
Rural South	Linda Webster	OWL	Yes
Rural West	Jane Marshall	Conservative	Yes
Skelmersdale North	Yvonne Gagen	Labour Co-op	No
Skelmersdale South	Vickie Cummins	Labour Co-op	Yes
Tanhouse & Skelmersdale; Town Centre	Paul Hogan (Note: Originally elected as Labour, but left the party to sit as an independent; later joined Your Party.)	Your Party	Yes (Note: Standing in Skelmersdale North ward.)
Tarleton Village	David Westley	Conservative	No
Up Holland	Suresh Patel	Labour	Yes

== Ward results ==
=== Aughton & Holborn ===
Augton & Holborn
Party	Candidate	Votes	%	±%
OWL	Anne Hughes	1,162	39.4	+14.3
Reform	Geoff Courtney	713	24.2	+18.7
Labour	Paul Hennessy	427	14.5	−27.2
Conservative	Bruce Porteous	397	13.5	−10.1
Green	Simon Cockburn	247	8.4	+3.3
Majority		449	15.2	N/A
Turnout		2,952	45.1	+10.1
Registered electors		6,552		
OWL gain from Labour		Swing	▼2.2	

=== Burscough Bridge & Rufford ===
Burscough Bridge & Rufford
Party	Candidate	Votes	%	±%
Reform	Alison Jones	827	28.8	N/A
OWL	Richard Bradshaw	758	26.4	−9.8
Conservative	Eddie Pope*	627	21.8	−8.2
Labour Co-op	Swin Purple	399	13.9	−13.7
Green	Conor Edwards	214	7.5	+3.9
Liberal Democrats	Ruxandra-Mihaela Trandafoiu	47	1.6	−1.0
Majority		69	2.4	N/A
Turnout		2,878	49.0	+12.0
Registered electors		5,870		
Reform gain from Conservative				

=== Burscough Town ===
Burscough Town
Party	Candidate	Votes	%	±%
OWL	Jess Riding	938	40.3	+17.8
Reform	Gareth Fairclough	629	27.0	N/A
Labour	Andy Fowler*	407	17.5	−38.3
Green	Richard Taylor	195	8.4	+8.3
Conservative	Joe de Freitas	159	6.8	−5.9
Majority		309	13.3	N/A
Turnout		2,330	40.7	+7.3
Registered electors		5,727		
OWL gain from Labour				

=== North Meols & Hesketh Bank ===
North Meols & Hesketh Bank
Party	Candidate	Votes	%	±%
Conservative	Thomas de Freitas*	1,304	51.8	+1.5
Reform	Nigel Swales	733	29.1	N/A
Labour	Noel Delaney	207	8.2	−23.5
Green	Clare Edwards	163	6.5	−2.3
Liberal Democrats	Karen Taylor	110	4.4	−4.8
Majority		571	22.7	+4.1
Turnout		2,519	42.9	+16.9
Registered electors		5,868		
Conservative hold				

=== Old Skelmersdale ===
Old Skelmersdale
Party	Candidate	Votes	%	±%
Reform	Ella Worthington	883	42.8	N/A
Labour	Karl Taraldsen	549	26.6	−50.0
Green	Freya Matthews	523	25.4	+14.3
Conservative	Richard Ainsworth	106	5.1	−7.2
Majority		334	16.2	N/A
Turnout		2,076	33.1	+10.1
Registered electors		6,267		
Reform gain from Labour				

=== Ormskirk East ===
Ormskirk East
Party	Candidate	Votes	%	±%
OWL	Michael Crompton	1,151	43.0	+0.2
Reform	Simon Evans	531	19.8	+15.5
Labour Co-op	Julie Gibson	524	19.6	−22.0
Green	Paul Hamby	320	11.9	+8.2
Conservative	Archie Fitzgerald	153	5.7	−1.4
Majority		620	23.2	+21.6
Turnout		2,682	45.9	+8.9
Registered electors		5,840		
OWL gain from Labour Co-op		Swing	▼7.7	

=== Ormskirk West ===
Ormskirk West
Party	Candidate	Votes	%	±%
OWL	Charles Berry	1,105	42.5	+5.8
Reform	Graham Gilbert	585	22.5	+17.3
Labour Co-op	Gareth Dowling*	480	18.5	−27.3
Green	Paul French	311	12.0	+6.1
Conservative	Ruth Melling	120	4.6	−1.8
Majority		520	20.0	N/A
Turnout		2,605	44.6	+10.6
Registered electors		5,847		
OWL gain from Labour Co-op		Swing	▼5.8	

=== Rural North East ===
Rural North East
Party	Candidate	Votes	%	±%
Conservative	Katie Juckes*	1,093	35.8	−18.9
Reform	Nicola Crawford	1,001	32.8	N/A
Labour Co-op	George Oliver	539	17.7	−17.8
Green	Adriana Dent	420	13.8	+3.9
Majority		92	3.0	–16.2
Turnout		3,063	50.1	+14.1
Registered electors		6,116		
Conservative hold				

=== Rural South ===
Rural South
Party	Candidate	Votes	%	±%
OWL	Linda Webster*	842	40.6	−7.6
Reform	Michael Sharples	580	28.0	N/A
Labour	Paul Rochford	259	12.5	−19.0
Green	Caitlyn Madden	238	11.5	+6.3
Conservative	Paul Turpin	154	7.4	−7.7
Majority		262	12.6	–4.1
Turnout		2,075	42.7	+13.7
Registered electors		4,854		
OWL hold				

=== Rural West ===
Rural West
Party	Candidate	Votes	%	±%
Reform	Gareth Oakes	1,191	46.7	N/A
Conservative	Jane Marshall*	527	20.7	−13.2
Labour	Michael Cooper	405	15.9	−13.0
Green	Charlotte Houltram	297	11.6	+4.3
Liberal Democrats	Jeffrey Christie	131	5.1	N/A
Majority		664	26.0	N/A
Turnout		2,553	44.3	+13.3
Registered electors		5,758		
Reform gain from Conservative				

=== Skelmersdale North ===
Skelmersdale North
Party	Candidate	Votes	%	±%
Reform	Lizzie Urquhart	780	38.8	N/A
Labour	Tom Phillips	533	26.5	−50.0
Green	Jay Lowe	329	16.4	N/A
Liberal Democrats	Peter Chandler	146	7.3	−4.7
Your Party	Paul Hogan*	145	7.2	N/A
Conservative	Susan Janvier	79	3.9	−7.7
Majority		247	12.3	N/A
Turnout		2,019	34.2	+12.2
Registered electors		5,899		
Reform gain from Labour Co-op				

=== Skelmersdale South ===
Skelmersdale South
Party	Candidate	Votes	%	±%
Reform	Nigel Hudson	581	34.1	N/A
OWL	Dave Beeston	455	26.7	N/A
Labour Co-op	Vickie Cummins*	364	21.3	−69.6
Green	Connor Rudge	202	11.8	N/A
Liberal Democrats	Tom Brown	57	3.3	N/A
Conservative	Susan Brake	46	2.7	−6.4
Majority		126	7.4	N/A
Turnout		1,708	29.7	+8.7
Registered electors		5,751		
Reform gain from Labour Co-op				

=== Tanhouse & Skelmersdale Town Centre ===
Tanhouse & Skelmersdale Town Centre
Party	Candidate	Votes	%	±%
Reform	Aaron Body	713	41.9	N/A
Labour	Terry Devine	348	20.4	−57.0
Your Party	Ron Cooper	305	17.9	N/A
Green	Neil Jackson	225	13.2	+1.8
Conservative	Julie Peel	63	3.7	−7.5
Liberal Democrats	Peter Gorrod	49	2.9	N/A
Majority		365	21.5	N/A
Turnout		1,711	27.2	+8.2
Registered electors		6,281		
Reform gain from Your Party				

=== Tarleton Village ===
Tarleton Village
Party	Candidate	Votes	%	±%
Conservative	Norma Goodier	1,236	45.6	+0.6
Reform	Karl Hunter	875	32.3	N/A
Labour	Kate Anderson	266	9.8	−19.0
Liberal Democrats	Tina Stringfellow	197	7.3	−7.8
Green	Suzanne Smith	138	5.1	−9.0
Majority		361	13.3	N/A
Turnout		2,718	47.1	+14.1
Registered electors		5,775		
Conservative hold				

=== Up Holland ===
Up Holland
Party	Candidate	Votes	%	±%
Reform	Richard Lee	1,028	40.0	N/A
Labour	Suresh Patel*	597	23.3	−39.0
OWL	Neil Pye	389	15.2	N/A
Green	Peter Craine	328	8.8	−6.4
Conservative	Jayne Rear	225	8.8	−13.6
Majority		431	16.7	N/A
Turnout		2,571	42.5	+14.5
Registered electors		6,044		
Reform gain from Labour				
