= 2004 West Lancashire District Council election =

2004 UK local government election

Results of the 2004 West Lancashire District Council election

The 2004 West Lancashire District Council election took place on 10 June 2004 to elect members of West Lancashire District Council in Lancashire, England. One third of the council was up for election and the Conservative Party stayed in overall control of the council.

After the election, the composition of the council was:

Party	Seats	±
Conservative	29	+1
Labour	25	-1

== Campaign ==
Before the election the Conservatives held 28 seats compared to 26 for Labour. 18 seats were contested in the election, with 9 seats being defended by each of the 2 parties. As well as candidates from the Conservative and Labour parties, there were also 7 independents, 4 Greens, 1 Liberal Democrat and 1 from the new Ormskirk Party. Both the Liberal Democrat and Ormskirk Party candidates were standing in Derby ward, which was seen as being one of the critical contests in the election.

A major issue in the election was privatisation, which the Conservatives supported saying it would improve efficiency, however Labour criticised the Conservatives plans saying investment should be kept in the area. The Conservatives called on voters to back their moves to establish litter free zones, create secure leisure facilities for young people and refurbish parks. However Labour attacked plans to sell council housing and the handing of a local park to a private developer. Other issues included crime, anti-social behaviour, CCTV and plans to move the accident and emergency department of Ormskirk hospital to Southport hospital.

== Election results ==
The results saw the Conservatives hold on to control of the council after making 1 gain from Labour. This meant the Conservatives held 29 seats compared to 25 for Labour and the election was described as a "vindication of Conservative policies running West Lancs" by the Conservative leader of the council, Geoff Roberts. Meanwhile, Labour's group leader on the council, Alan Bullen, only narrowly held his own seat on the council in Skelmersdale North. Overall turnout in the election was up by 14% at 42.47%.

West Lancashire local election result 2004
Party	Seats	Gains	Losses	Net gain/loss	Seats %	Votes %	Votes	+/−
Conservative	10	1	0	+1	55.6	47.4	13,309	+1.3
Labour	8	0	1	-1	44.4	36.9	10,346	-3.0
Independent	0	0	0	0	0.0	10.6	2,979	-0.5
Green	0	0	0	0	0.0	3.3	937	+0.4
Ormskirk Party	0	0	0	0	0.0	1.1	298	+1.1
Liberal Democrats	0	0	0	0	0.0	0.7	190	+0.7

== Ward results ==
=== Ashurst ===
Ashurst
Party	Candidate	Votes	%	±%
Labour	Donna Duffy	911	57.4	+4.3
Independent	Patrick McElhinney	347	21.9	−7.6
Conservative	David Meadows	330	20.8	+3.4
Majority		564	35.5	+11.9
Turnout		1,588	33.4	+14.7
Labour hold		Swing		

=== Aughton and Downholland ===
Aughton and Downholland
Party	Candidate	Votes	%	±%
Conservative	Una Atherley	1,725	77.4	+16.7
Labour	David McKay	503	22.6	−16.7
Majority		1,222	54.8	+33.4
Turnout		2,228	49.4	+15.4
Conservative hold		Swing		

=== Birch Green ===
Birch Green
Party	Candidate	Votes	%	±%
Labour	Mary Pendleton	676	81.0	−3.6
Conservative	Susan Cropper	159	19.0	+3.6
Majority		517	62.0	−7.2
Turnout		835	27.8	+14.9
Labour hold		Swing		

=== Burscough ===
Burscough East
Party	Candidate	Votes	%	±%
Conservative	Florence Westley	900	60.6	
Labour	Anne Carter	584	39.4	
Majority		316	21.2	
Turnout		1,484	49.7	
Conservative hold		Swing		

=== Burscough West ===
Burscough West
Party	Candidate	Votes	%	±%
Labour	Cynthia Dereli	832	52.2	
Conservative	Graham Jones	763	47.8	
Majority		69	4.4	
Turnout		1,595	41.6	
Labour hold		Swing		

=== Derby ===
Derby
Party	Candidate	Votes	%	±%
Conservative	Adrian Owens	987	45.5	−2.0
Labour	Alan Williams	550	25.3	−16.3
Ormskirk Party	Margaret Heslegrave	298	13.7	+13.7
Liberal Democrats	Julian Reid	190	8.8	+8.8
Green	Anne Doyle	146	6.7	−4.1
Majority		437	20.2	+14.3
Turnout		2,171	47.0	+18.8
Conservative hold		Swing		

=== Digmoor ===
Digmoor
Party	Candidate	Votes	%	±%
Labour	Terence Aldridge	710	72.9	−2.6
Independent	Alan Spears	147	15.1	+0.9
Conservative	Irene O'Donnell	117	12.0	+1.7
Majority		563	57.8	−3.5
Turnout		974	31.0	+14.6
Labour hold		Swing		

=== Halsall ===
Halsall
Party	Candidate	Votes	%	±%
Conservative	Doreen Stephenson	459	55.4	−18.4
Independent	Raymond Brookfield	370	44.6	+44.6
Majority		89	10.8	−36.8
Turnout		829	47.0	
Conservative hold		Swing		

=== Hesketh-with-Becconsall ===
Hesketh-with-Becconsall
Party	Candidate	Votes	%	±%
Conservative	Martin Forshaw	820	63.8	
Independent	Nadine Ashcroft	466	36.2	
Majority		354	27.6	
Turnout		1,286	42.8	
Conservative hold		Swing		

=== Knowsley ===
Knowsley
Party	Candidate	Votes	%	±%
Conservative	Peter Lea	1,360	61.4	+4.8
Labour	Francis Williams	652	29.4	−2.8
Green	John Watt	204	9.2	−2.0
Majority		708	32.0	+7.6
Turnout		2,216	49.2	+20.8
Conservative hold		Swing		

=== Moorside ===
Moorside
Party	Candidate	Votes	%	±%
Labour	Stephen Hanlon	664	82.3	
Conservative	Malcolm Barron	143	17.7	
Majority		521	64.6	
Turnout		807	29.2	
Labour hold		Swing		

=== Rufford ===
Rufford
Party	Candidate	Votes	%	±%
Conservative	Joan Colling	609	77.7	+2.4
Labour	Shan Annis	175	22.3	−2.4
Majority		434	55.4	+4.8
Turnout		784	47.3	
Conservative hold		Swing		

=== Scott ===
Scott
Party	Candidate	Votes	%	±%
Conservative	Cyril Ainscough	1,044	48.1	+10.4
Labour	Noel Delaney	820	37.8	−0.5
Green	Maurice George	305	14.1	+4.6
Majority		224	10.3	
Turnout		2,169	47.0	+14.5
Conservative gain from Labour		Swing		

=== Skelmersdale North ===
Skelmersdale North
Party	Candidate	Votes	%	±%
Labour	Alan Bullen	531	45.7	−15.4
Independent	Joan Morrison	473	40.7	+14.2
Conservative	Joan Witter	157	13.5	+1.0
Majority		58	5.0	−29.6
Turnout		1,161	37.4	+13.9
Labour hold		Swing		

=== Skelmersdale South ===
Skelmersdale South
Party	Candidate	Votes	%	±%
Labour	Sydney Jones	1,077	63.6	−10.2
Conservative	Richard Shepherd	334	19.7	+5.5
Green	Martin Lowe	282	16.7	+4.7
Majority		743	43.9	−15.7
Turnout		1,693	33.9	+15.3
Labour hold		Swing		

=== Tarleton ===
Tarleton
Party	Candidate	Votes	%	±%
Conservative	John Mee	1,431	63.9	+4.6
Independent	John Hodson	810	36.1	−4.6
Majority		621	27.8	+9.2
Turnout		2,241	50.5	+13.5
Conservative hold		Swing		

=== Up Holland ===
Up Holland
Party	Candidate	Votes	%	±%
Labour	Margaret Skilling	1,066	48.0	−7.2
Conservative	Ruth Pollock	787	35.5	−9.3
Independent	Karen Horrocks	366	16.5	+16.5
Majority		279	12.5	+2.1
Turnout		2,219	45.2	+14.9
Labour hold		Swing		

=== Wrightington ===
Wrightington
Party	Candidate	Votes	%	±%
Conservative	Peter Gartside	1,184	66.6	+17.4
Labour	Pauline Bailey	595	33.4	−17.4
Majority		589	33.2	
Turnout		1,779	52.7	+15.5
Conservative hold		Swing		
