= 1986 West Lancashire District Council election =

1986 UK local government election

The 1986 West Lancashire District Council election took place on 1 May 1986 to elect members of West Lancashire District Council in Lancashire, England. One third of the council was up for election and the Conservative Party lost overall control of the council.

After the election, the composition of the council was:

| Party | Seats | ± |
|---|---|---|
| Conservative | 27 | -3 |
| Labour | 21 | +2 |
| Social Democrat | 3 | +1 |
| Liberal | 1 | 0 |
| Independent | 3 | 0 |

== Ward results ==
Aughton Town Green
| Party | Candidate | Votes | % | ±% |
|---|---|---|---|---|
| Conservative | Raymond Wardle | 1,041 | | |
| SDP | Grace Wyatt | 345 | | |
| Labour | Judith Pickthall | 290 | | |
| Majority | | | | |
| Turnout | | | | |
| Conservative hold | | Swing | | |

Birch Green (2 seats)
| Party | Candidate | Votes | % | ±% |
|---|---|---|---|---|
| Labour | Danny Bassey | 1,637 | | |
| SDP | Robert Jones | 865 | | |
| Conservative | Ronald Brown | 465 | | |
| Conservative | Florence Smith | 420 | | |
| Majority | | | | |
| Majority | | | | |
| Turnout | | | | |
| Labour hold | | Swing | | |
| SDP gain from Labour | | Swing | | |

Burscough
| Party | Candidate | Votes | % | ±% |
|---|---|---|---|---|
| Labour | Anne Maguire | 806 | | |
| Conservative | Ronald Barker | 721 | | |
| SDP | Margaret McCain | 161 | | |
| Majority | | | | |
| Turnout | | | | |
| Labour gain from Conservative | | Swing | | |

Derby
| Party | Candidate | Votes | % | ±% |
|---|---|---|---|---|
| SDP | Robert Jermyn | 1,108 | | |
| Conservative | William Rigby | 984 | | |
| Labour | Maurice George | 647 | | |
| Majority | | | | |
| Turnout | | | | |
| SDP gain from Conservative | | Swing | | |

Downholland
| Party | Candidate | Votes | % | ±% |
|---|---|---|---|---|
| Conservative | Alexander Chadwick | 294 | | |
| SDP | Andrew Johnson | 91 | | |
| Labour | Christopher Sawyer | 53 | | |
| Majority | | | | |
| Turnout | | | | |
| Conservative hold | | Swing | | |

Knowsley
| Party | Candidate | Votes | % | ±% |
|---|---|---|---|---|
| Conservative | Val Hopley | 902 | | |
| SDP | Matthew Cochrane | 753 | | |
| Labour | Bernard Brown | 323 | | |
| Majority | | | | |
| Turnout | | | | |
| Conservative hold | | Swing | | |

Lathom
| Party | Candidate | Votes | % | ±% |
|---|---|---|---|---|
| Conservative | Malcolm Gibbons | 877 | | |
| Labour | John Draper | 450 | | |
| SDP | Carol Jermyn | 100 | | |
| Majority | | | | |
| Turnout | | | | |
| Conservative hold | | Swing | | |

Moorside
| Party | Candidate | Votes | % | ±% |
|---|---|---|---|---|
| Labour | Francis Riley | 665 | | |
| SDP | Stephen Gaskill | 93 | | |
| Conservative | James Hignett | 93 | | |
| Communist | Terence Aldridge | 80 | | |
| Majority | | | | |
| Turnout | | | | |
| Labour hold | | Swing | | |

Newburgh
| Party | Candidate | Votes | % | ±% |
|---|---|---|---|---|
| Conservative | Kenneth Vincent | 559 | | |
| Labour | Cynthia Dereli | 154 | | |
| SDP | Louise Randall | 146 | | |
| Majority | | | | |
| Turnout | | | | |
| Conservative hold | | Swing | | |

North Meols (2 seats)
| Party | Candidate | Votes | % | ±% |
|---|---|---|---|---|
| Conservative | William Ryding | 515 | | |
| Conservative | David Bintcliffe | 500 | | |
| Labour | Peter Wynn | 281 | | |
| Labour | Joan Draper | 280 | | |
| SDP | Andrew Cowley | 90 | | |
| Majority | | | | |
| Turnout | | | | |
| Conservative hold | | Swing | | |
| Conservative hold | | Swing | | |

Parbold
| Party | Candidate | Votes | % | ±% |
|---|---|---|---|---|
| Conservative | Peter Turner | 968 | | |
| SDP | David Pryer | 423 | | |
| Labour | Patricia Carson | 208 | | |
| Majority | | | | |
| Turnout | | | | |
| Conservative hold | | Swing | | |

Scarisbrick
| Party | Candidate | Votes | % | ±% |
|---|---|---|---|---|
| Conservative | Margaret Edwards | 561 | | |
| Labour | Victor Coman | 125 | | |
| SDP | Mark Winstanley | 110 | | |
| Majority | | | | |
| Turnout | | | | |
| Conservative hold | | Swing | | |

Scott
| Party | Candidate | Votes | % | ±% |
|---|---|---|---|---|
| Labour | Ash Martin | 1,045 | | |
| Conservative | Anthony Toal | 885 | | |
| SDP | Jill Cochrane | 291 | | |
| Majority | | | | |
| Turnout | | | | |
| Labour gain from Conservative | | Swing | | |

Skelmersdale North
| Party | Candidate | Votes | % | ±% |
|---|---|---|---|---|
| Labour | Jean White | 1,111 | | |
| Conservative | George Alty | 233 | | |
| SDP | Rosamond Bull | 177 | | |
| Majority | | | | |
| Turnout | | | | |
| Labour hold | | Swing | | |

Skelmersdale South
| Party | Candidate | Votes | % | ±% |
|---|---|---|---|---|
| Labour | Peter Harrison | 1,124 | | |
| SDP | Joan Critchley | 239 | | |
| Conservative | Ronald Harrison | 145 | | |
| Majority | | | | |
| Turnout | | | | |
| Labour hold | | Swing | | |

Tanhouse
| Party | Candidate | Votes | % | ±% |
|---|---|---|---|---|
| Labour | Stanley Sent | 999 | | |
| SDP | Thomas Sweeney | 228 | | |
| Conservative | Sylvia Winters | 134 | | |
| Majority | | | | |
| Turnout | | | | |
| Labour hold | | Swing | | |

Tarleton
| Party | Candidate | Votes | % | ±% |
|---|---|---|---|---|
| Conservative | Barry Gannaway-Jones | 803 | | |
| SDP | Roy Hiscock | 314 | | |
| Labour | Wayne Marland | 182 | | |
| Majority | | | | |
| Turnout | | | | |
| Conservative hold | | Swing | | |

Upholland South
| Party | Candidate | Votes | % | ±% |
|---|---|---|---|---|
| Labour | John Burke | 735 | | |
| Conservative | Peter Edwards | 593 | | |
| Majority | | | | |
| Turnout | | | | |
| Labour gain from SDP | | Swing | | |
