= 2012 West Lancashire Borough Council election =

2012 UK local government election

Results of the 2012 West Lancashire Borough Council election

The 2012 West Lancashire Borough Council election took place on 3 May 2012 to elect members of West Lancashire Borough Council in Lancashire, England. One third of the council was up for election, with results compared to the corresponding vote in 2008 West Lancashire Council election.

West Lancashire local election result 2012
Party	Seats	Gains	Losses	Net gain/loss	Seats %	Votes %	Votes	+/−
Conservative	7	0	5	-5	38.9	35.64	7991	-18.56
Labour	11	5	0	+5	61.1	56.04	12566	+19.24
Liberal Democrats	0	0	0	0	0	0.58	131	N/A
UKIP	0	0	0	0	0	0.41	91	N/A
Green	0	0	0	0	0	4.11	921	+1.01
Independent	0	0	0	0	0	1.07	241	-0.53

== Ward results ==
=== Ashurst ===
Ashurst
Party	Candidate	Votes	%	±%
Labour	Gail Hodson	1046	77.2%	
Conservative	Stacey Griffiths	171	12.6%	
Green	Elizabeth Boorman	138	10.2%	
Majority		871	64.0%	
Turnout		1362	28.1%	

=== Aughton and Downholland ===
Aughton and Downholland
Party	Candidate	Votes	%	±%
Conservative	Una Atherley	913	59.8%	
Labour	Paul Hennessy	613	40.2%	
Majority		300	19.4%	
Turnout		1543	34.1%	

=== Birch Green ===
Birch Green
Party	Candidate	Votes	%	±%
Labour	Lucy Hodson	686	86.7%	
Conservative	Jane Marshall	60	7.6%	
Green	Peter Cranie	45	5.7%	
Majority		626	78.6%	
Turnout		796	25.5%	

=== Burscough East ===
Burscough East
Party	Candidate	Votes	%	±%
Labour	Roger Bell	461	42.0%	
Conservative	George Pratt	396	36.1%	
Independent	Brian Bailey	241	21.9%	
Majority		65	5.8%	
Turnout		1116	34.1%	

=== Burscough West ===
Burscough West
Party	Candidate	Votes	%	±%
Labour	Cynthia Dereli	960	67.8%	
Conservative	Jason Grice	455	32.2%	
Majority		505	35.4%	
Turnout		1423	36.3%	

=== Derby ===
Derby
Party	Candidate	Votes	%	±%
Conservative	Adrian Owens	883	51.7%	
Labour	Gareth Dowling	575	33.6%	
Green	Anne Doyle	160	9.4%	
UKIP	Thomas Roughley	91	5.3%	
Majority		308	18.0%	
Turnout		1712	31.1%	

=== Digmoor ===
Digmoor
Party	Candidate	Votes	%	±%
Labour	Kevin Wilkie	842	90.6%	
Conservative	Ryan Waite	68	7.3%	
Liberal Democrats	Peter Finnigan	19	2.0%	
Majority		774	82.4%	
Turnout		939	30.1%	

=== Halsall ===
Halsall
Party	Candidate	Votes	%	±%
Conservative	Doreen Stephenson	331	52.3%	
Labour	Raymond Brookfield	302	47.7%	
Majority		29	4.5%	
Turnout		648	37.5%	

=== Hesketh-with-Becconsall ===
Hesketh-with-Becconsall
Party	Candidate	Votes	%	±%
Conservative	Martin Forshaw	544	64.5%	
Labour	Joan Draper	300	35.5%	
Majority		244	28.6%	
Turnout		853	27.1%	

=== Knowsley ===
Knowsley
Party	Candidate	Votes	%	±%
Labour	George Oliver	918	51.3%	
Conservative	David Meadows	711	39.7%	
Green	John Watt	161	9.0%	
Majority		207	11.5%	
Turnout		1802	40.4%	

=== Moorside ===
Moorside
Party	Candidate	Votes	%	±%
Labour	Terence Aldridge	753	90.4%	
Conservative	Cindy Miller	80	9.6%	
Majority		673	80.0%	
Turnout		841	30.2%	

=== Rufford ===
Rufford
Party	Candidate	Votes	%	±%
Conservative	Jane Houlgrave	333	45.2%	
Independent	John Gordon	293	39.8%	
Labour	Simon Perkins	111	15.1%	
Majority		40	5.3%	
Turnout		741	43.9%	

=== Scott ===
Scott
Party	Candidate	Votes	%	±%
Labour	Kevin Wright	923	54.2	+23.0
Conservative	Edward McCarthy	516	30.3	−25.4
Green	Maurice George	151	8.9	−4.9
Liberal Democrats	Peter Banks	112	6.6	N/A
Majority		407	23.8	−0.7
Turnout		1707	37.5	+2.7

=== Skelmersdale North ===
Skelmersdale North
Party	Candidate	Votes	%	±%
Labour	Neil Furey	945	89.7%	
Conservative	Amanda Shaw	109	10.3%	
Majority		836	78.4%	
Turnout		1066	34.7%	

=== Skelmersdale South ===
Skelmersdale South
Party	Candidate	Votes	%	±%
Labour	Donna West	1165	82.4%	
Conservative	David Gallagher	134	9.5%	
Green	Martin Lowe	114	8.1%	
Majority		1031	72.4%	
Turnout		1424	28.4%	

=== Tarleton ===
Tarleton
Party	Candidate	Votes	%	±%
Conservative	Rosie Evans	1076	73.3%	
Labour	Margaret Blake	391	26.7%	
Majority		685	45.9%	
Turnout		1491	33.0%	

=== Up Holland ===
Up Holland
Party	Candidate	Votes	%	±%
Labour	Gaynar Owen	1124	64.4%	
Conservative	Ruth Pollock	622	35.6%	
Majority		502	28.4%	
Turnout		1762	35.6%	

=== Wrightington ===
Wrightington
Party	Candidate	Votes	%	±%
Conservative	Carolyn Evans	589	49.4%	
Labour	Jennifer Patterson	451	37.8%	
Green	Julie Hotchkiss	152	12.8%	
Majority		138	11.5%	
Turnout		1197	35.75	
