= 1999 West Lancashire District Council election =

1999 UK local government election

The 1999 West Lancashire District Council election took place on 6 May 1999 to elect members of West Lancashire District Council in Lancashire, England. One third of the council was up for election and the Labour Party stayed in overall control of the council.

After the election, the composition of the council was:

Party	Seats	±
Labour	32	-1
Conservative	21	+1
Independent	2	0

== Election result ==
West Lancashire local election result 1999
Party	Seats	Gains	Losses	Net gain/loss	Seats %	Votes %	Votes	+/−
Labour	10			-1	52.6			
Conservative	8			+1	42.1			
Independent	1			0	5.3			
