= 2000 West Lancashire District Council election =

2000 UK local government election

The 2000 West Lancashire District Council election took place on 4 May 2000 to elect members of West Lancashire District Council in Lancashire, England. One third of the council was up for election and the Labour Party stayed in overall control of the council.

After the election, the composition of the council was:

Party	Seats	±
Labour	31	-1
Conservative	22	+1
Independent	2	0

== Election results ==
West Lancashire local election result 2000
Party	Seats	Gains	Losses	Net gain/loss	Seats %	Votes %	Votes	+/−
Labour	11			-1	61.1			
Conservative	7			+1	38.9			
