= 2015 West Lancashire Borough Council election =

2015 UK local government election

Results of the 2015 West Lancashire Borough Council election

The 2015 West Lancashire Borough Council election took place on 7 May 2015, to elect members of West Lancashire Borough Council in Lancashire, England. One third of the council participated in the election. The UK general election was also held on 7 May 2015.

== Ward results ==
=== Ashurst ===
Ashurst
Party	Candidate	Votes	%	±%
Labour	Liz Savage	2,211	71.9	−5.4%
UKIP	Barry Critchley	472	15.4	+15.4%
Conservative	George Pratt	391	12.7	−10.0%
Majority		1,739		
Turnout		3,104	68.2	

=== Aughton and Downholland ===
Aughton and Downholland
Party	Candidate	Votes	%	±%
Conservative	David Westley	1,554	46.4	−13.5%
Labour	Charles Gains	1,071	32.0	−9.1%
UKIP	Jim Bevan	497	14.8	+14.8%
Green	Hannah James	229	6.8	+6.8%
Majority		483		
Turnout		3,366	74.4%	

=== Aughton Park ===
Aughton Park
Party	Candidate	Votes	%	±%
Conservative	Marilyn Westley	1,116	48.4	−21.3%
Labour	Paul Hennessy	818	35.5	+5.2%
UKIP	David Gallagher	373	16.2	+16.2%
Majority		298		
Turnout		2,319	73.1	

=== Bickerstaffe ===
Bickerstaffe
Party	Candidate	Votes	%	±%
Labour	Paul Cotterill	511	41.4	−2.5%
Conservative	David Griffiths	458	37.1	−19.0%
UKIP	Ken Tyms	150	12.2	+12.2%
Our West Lancashire	Gordon Johnson	115	9.3	+9.3%
Majority		53	4.3	
Turnout		1,234	75.2	

=== Birch Green ===
Birch Green
Party	Candidate	Votes	%	±%
Labour	Frank McKenna	1,255	75.5	−12.8%
UKIP	Damon Noone	272	16.4	+16.4%
Conservative	David Meadows	135	8.1	−3.6%
Majority		983		
Turnout		1662	58.2	

=== Derby ===
Derby
Party	Candidate	Votes	%	±%
Labour	Phill Hudson	1,177	35.5	−0.1%
Conservative	Edward McCarthy	1,055	31.8	−21.1%
Our West Lancashire	Ian Davis	460	13.9	+13.9%
Green	Heather Doyle	323	9.7	−1.9%
UKIP	Ray Brookfield	302	9.1	+9.1%
Majority		122	3.7	
Turnout		3,323	69	

=== Digmoor ===
Digmoor
Party	Candidate	Votes	%	±%
Labour	Chris Wynn	1,512	83.5	−1.7%
Conservative	Richard Shepherd	151	8.3	−1.9%
Green	William Hite	148	8.2	+8.2%
Majority		1,361		
Turnout		1,820	61.2	

=== Knowsley ===
Knowsley
Party	Candidate	Votes	%	±%
Labour	Nikki Hennessy	1,512	45.4	+4.3%
Conservative	Rob Murrin-Bailey	1,125	33.8	−14.5%
UKIP	Tony Green	316	9.5	+9.5%
Green	Gaynor Pickering	188	5.7	−4.8%
Our West Lancashire	Peter Banks	186	5.6	+5.6%
Majority		387	11.6	
Turnout		3,345	73.7	

=== North Meols ===
North Meols
Party	Candidate	Votes	%	±%
Conservative	Tom Blane	1,026	50.5	−14.5%
Labour	Andrew Pritchard	586	28.8	−6.2%
UKIP	Richard Smith	420	20.7	+20.7%
Majority		440		
Turnout		2,052	65.0	

=== Parbold ===
Parbold
Party	Candidate	Votes	%	±%
Conservative	May Blake	1,412	60.5	−7.4%
Labour	Clare Gillard	761	32.6	+0.5%
Green	Jai Brierley	162	6.9	+6.9%
Majority		651		
Turnout		2,347	77.8	

=== Scarisbrick ===
Scarisbrick
Party	Candidate	Votes	%	±%
Conservative	Charles Marshall	1,190	55.1	−11.7%
Labour	Margaret Blake	525	24.3	−8.9%
UKIP	David Massam	345	16.0	+16.0%
Green	John Watt	100	4.6	+4.6%
Majority		665		
Turnout		2,167	72.1	

=== Scott ===
Scott
Party	Candidate	Votes	%	±%
Labour	John Hodson	1,189	39.5	−6.6%
Conservative	William Weingart	732	24.3	−14.1%
Our West Lancashire	Jane Thompson	578	19.2	+19.2%
UKIP	Tom Shannon	298	9.9	+9.9%
Green	Maurice George	212	7.0	−1.4%
Majority		457		
Turnout		3,020	68.6	

=== Skelmersdale North ===
Skelmersdale North
Party	Candidate	Votes	%	±%
Labour	Jennifer Patterson	1,623	84.7	−0.3%
Conservative	Susan Janvier	293	15.3	+0.3%
Majority		1,330		
Turnout		1,947	67.3	

=== Skelmersdale South ===
Skelmersdale South
Party	Candidate	Votes	%	±%
Labour	Nicola Pryce-Roberts	2,240	71.3	+0.1%
Conservative	Jennifer Mayer	451	14.4	−7.1%
Our West Lancashire	Gerry Latham	243	7.7	+7.7%
Green	Martin Lowe	207	6.6	−0.7%
Majority		1,789		
Turnout		3,160	67.8	

=== Tanhouse ===
Tanhouse
Party	Candidate	Votes	%	±%
Labour	Maureen Nixon	1,644	83.9	+4.4%
Conservative	Amanda Shaw	316	16.1	−4.4%
Majority		1,328		
Turnout		1,988	58.0	

=== Tarleton ===
Tarleton
Party	Candidate	Votes	%	±%
Conservative	James Kay	1,738	54.6	−14.1%
Labour	Neil Pye	544	17.1	−14.2%
UKIP	Barry Gannaway-Jones	482	15.1	+25.1%
Independent	Jim Doran	422	13.2	+13.2%
Majority		1,194		
Turnout		3,197	70.5	

=== Up Holland ===
Up Holland
Party	Candidate	Votes	%	±%
Labour	John Bullock	1,743	50.9	−5.8%
Conservative	Ruth Pollock	1,020	29.8	−7.6%
UKIP	John Stewart	661	19.3	+19.3%
Majority		723		
Turnout		3,445	70.7	

=== Wrightington ===
Wrightington
Party	Candidate	Votes	%	±%
Conservative	Pam Baybutt	1,334	55.3	−9.8%
Green	Julie Hotchkiss	744	30.8	+30.8%
Labour	Sophia Hennessy	335	13.6	−21.3%
Majority		590		
Turnout		2,428	73.1	
