= 2024 West Lancashire Borough Council election =

Local election in Lancashire, England

← 2023	2 May 2024	2026 →

16 of 45 seats on West Lancashire Borough Council 23 seats needed for a majority

	First party	Second party	Third party
Leader	Yvonne Gagen	David Westley	Ian Rigby
Party	Labour	Conservative	OWL
Seats before	26	15 (Note: Including one vacant seat in Tarleton Village ward last held by the Conservatives.)	4
Seats after	26	14	5
- Results by ward (including by-election in Tarleton Village)
Leader before election
Yvonne Gagen
Labour
Leader after election
Yvonne Gagen
Labour

The 2024 West Lancashire Borough Council election took place on 2 May 2024 to elect members of West Lancashire Borough Council. 16 of the 45 seats of the council were up for election. The election took place at the same time as other local elections across England.

The council remained under Labour majority control.

== Ward results ==
=== Aughton & Holborn ===
Aughton & Holborn
Party	Candidate	Votes	%	±%
Labour	Kerry Lloyd	931	40.7	−9.0
OWL	Gordon Johnson	575	25.1	N/A
Conservative	Bruce Porteous	540	23.6	−20.0
Reform UK	Nigel Wilson	126	5.5	N/A
Green	Paul Hamby	116	5.1	N/A
Turnout		2,288	35	
Labour hold		Swing		

=== Burscough Bridge & Rufford ===
Burscough Bridge & Rufford
Party	Candidate	Votes	%	±%
OWL	Paul Hesketh	766	36.2	+24.6
Conservative	Jayne Rear	636	30.0	−17.2
Labour	Swin Purple	584	27.6	−11.9
Green	Reese Riding	76	3.6	N/A
Liberal Democrats	Karen Taylor	55	2.6	N/A
Turnout		2,117	37	
OWL gain from Conservative		Swing		

=== Burscough Town ===
Burscough Town
Party	Candidate	Votes	%	±%
Labour	Judy Abbott	960	55.8	+12.6
OWL	Adi Cotter	387	22.5	−22.2
Conservative	Ruth Melling	219	12.7	−11.5
Liberal Democrats	Neil Pollington	85	4.9	−7.5
Green	Simon Greenhalgh	70	4.1	N/A
Turnout		1,721	33	
Labour gain from OWL		Swing		

=== North Meols & Hesketh ===
North Meols & Hesketh
Party	Candidate	Votes	%	±%
Conservative	Ian Eccles	768	50.3	−1.3
Labour	Jan Monaghan	484	31.7	+3.7
Liberal Democrats	Sarah Clifton	140	9.2	−4.8
Green	William Black	134	8.8	−3.8
Turnout		1,526	26	
Conservative hold		Swing		

=== Old Skelmersdale ===
Old Skelmersdale
Party	Candidate	Votes	%	±%
Labour	Donna West	1,102	76.6	+5.9
Conservative	Jason Chapman	177	12.3	+0.2
Green	Kath Lockie	159	11.1	N/A
Turnout		1,438	23	
Labour hold		Swing		

=== Ormskirk East ===
Ormskirk East
Party	Candidate	Votes	%	±%
OWL	Janet Ingman	957	43.2	+0.3
Labour	Adam Yates	922	41.6	−1.8
Conservative	Jason Grice	157	7.1	±0.0
Reform UK	Simon Evans	96	4.3	N/A
Green	Richard Taylor	82	3.7	N/A
Turnout		2,214	37	
OWL gain from Labour		Swing		

=== Ormskirk West ===
Ormskirk West
Party	Candidate	Votes	%	±%
Labour	Anne Fennell	948	45.8	−3.2
OWL	Jane Thompson	760	36.7	−4.3
Conservative	Juliana Gudgeon	133	6.4	−1.9
Green	Paul French	122	5.9	N/A
Reform UK	John Bullock	107	5.2	N/A
Turnout		2,070	34	
Labour hold		Swing		

=== Rural North East ===
Rural North East
Party	Candidate	Votes	%	±%
Conservative	David Whittington	1,203	54.7	+13.0
Labour	Jennie Jackson	781	35.5	−0.8
Green	Carole Dundas	217	9.9	N/A
Turnout		2,201	36	
Conservative hold		Swing		

=== Rural South ===
Rural South
Party	Candidate	Votes	%	±%
OWL	Adrian Owens	708	48.2	+2.9
Labour	Paul Dickie	462	31.5	−1.2
Conservative	Asheem Naraen	222	15.1	−0.3
Green	Karen Field	76	5.2	N/A
Turnout		1,468	29	
OWL hold		Swing		

=== Rural West ===
Rural West
Party	Candidate	Votes	%	±%
Conservative	Marilyn Westley	589	33.9	−4.3
OWL	Mark Brown	520	30.0	−2.4
Labour	George Oliver	501	28.9	−8.4
Green	Lisa Smith	126	7.3	N/A
Turnout		1,736	31	
Conservative hold		Swing		

=== Skelmersdale North ===
Skelmersdale North
Party	Candidate	Votes	%	±%
Labour	Melissa Parlour	959	76.5	+3.5
Liberal Democrats	Peter Chandler	150	12.0	N/A
Conservative	Sue Brake	145	11.6	−1.8
Turnout		1,254	22	
Labour hold		Swing		

=== Skelmersdale South ===
Skelmersdale South
Party	Candidate	Votes	%	±%
Labour	Julian Finch	1,103	90.9	+26.2
Conservative	Sue Janvier	110	9.1	+1.8
Turnout		1,213	21	
Labour hold		Swing		

=== Tanhouse & Skelmersdale Town Centre ===
Tanhouse & Skelmersdale Town Centre
Party	Candidate	Votes	%	±%
Labour	Maureen Nixon	925	77.4	+1.2
Green	Peter Chandler	136	11.4	N/A
Conservative	Sue Brake	134	11.2	−1.6
Turnout		1,195	19	
Labour hold		Swing		

=== Tarleton Village ===
Tarleton Village
Party	Candidate	Votes	%	±%
Conservative	John Mee	985	53.2	−1.0
Conservative	David Westley	834	45.0	−9.0
Labour	Michelle Matthews	614	33.1	+1.5
Labour	Damian Owen	527	28.4	+0.4
Liberal Democrats	Tina Stringfellow	279	15.1	−5.6
Green	Edwin Black	262	14.1	N/A
Turnout		1,853	33	
Conservative hold		Swing		
Conservative hold		Swing		

=== Up Holland ===
Up Holland
Party	Candidate	Votes	%	±%
Labour	Gaynar Owen	1,056	62.3	+0.3
Conservative	Julie Peel	380	22.4	−3.7
Green	Charlotte Houltram	258	15.2	N/A
Turnout		1,694	28	
Labour hold		Swing		

== By-elections ==
=== Aughton & Holborn ===
Aughton & Holborn by-election: 9 October 2025
Party	Candidate	Votes	%	±%
OWL	Gordon Johnson	704	35.5	+10.4
Reform UK	Aaron Body	478	24.1	+18.6
Labour	Karl Taraldsen	385	19.4	–21.3
Conservative	Bruce Porteous	295	14.9	–8.7
Green	Charlotte Houltram	78	3.9	–1.2
Liberal Democrats	Peter Chandler	42	2.1	N/A
Majority		226	11.4	N/A
Turnout		1,986	30.4	–4.6
Registered electors		6,529		
OWL gain from Labour		Swing	▼4.1	

== See also ==
- West Lancashire Borough Council elections
