= 2003 West Lancashire District Council election =

2003 UK local government election

Results of the 2003 West Lancashire District Council election

The 2003 West Lancashire District Council election took place on 1 May 2003 to elect members of West Lancashire District Council in Lancashire, England. One third of the council was up for election and the Conservative Party stayed in overall control of the council.

After the election, the composition of the council was:

Party	Seats	±
Conservative	28	-2
Labour	26	+2

== Campaign ==
Before the election the Conservatives held 30 seats compared to 24 for the Labour Party, after the Conservatives gained a majority in the 2002 election for the first time since 1991. 18 seats were contested in the election with the Conservatives defending 11 and Labour 7. In total 46 candidates stood in the election, made up of 18 Conservative, 17 Labour, 4 Green and 7 independent candidates. No Liberal Democrats stood in the election, with their local party reported to have fewer than 100 members. Among the councillors defending their seats in the election was the Conservative council leader, Geoffrey Roberts, while a former Labour councillor John Fillis stood as in independent in Scott ward, after having been cleared earlier in the year of defrauding Labour Party accounts during the 1997 general election.

The election was seen as being a close contest being the Conservative and Labour parties, but the Liverpool Echo felt apathy among Labour voters could imperil some Labour held seats in Skelmersdale. The Conservatives defended their record in control of the council for the past year, pointing to a recycling scheme they had introduced, improvements they claimed to have made in street cleaning and they pledged to continue investing in services. However Labour attacked the Conservatives for scrapping a community warden scheme, pledged that they would end a pest control charge and would provide a new cemetery for the area. Labour also accused the Conservatives of planning to privatise services to a Liverpool company, however this was denied by the Conservatives.

== Election results ==
The results saw the Conservatives remain in control of the council despite losing 2 seats to Labour. Labour narrowly gained seats in Scott and Wrightington wards from the Conservative after a recount. This meant the Conservatives only had a majority of 2, with 28 seats compared to 26 for Labour. No other candidates were elected with all 7 independents being defeated. Overall turnout in the election was 27.5%.

West Lancashire local election result 2003
Party	Seats	Gains	Losses	Net gain/loss	Seats %	Votes %	Votes	+/−
Conservative	9	0	2	-2	50.0	46.1	8.497	-1.4
Labour	9	2	0	+2	50.0	39.9	7,363	-0.1
Independent	0	0	0	0	0.0	11.1	2,043	-0.4
Green	0	0	0	0	0.0	2.9	541	+2.1

== Ward results ==
=== Ashurst ===
Ashurst
Party	Candidate	Votes	%	±%
Labour	Ann Rice	483	53.1	
Independent	Patrick McElhinney	268	29.5	
Conservative	Paul Boulton	158	17.4	
Majority		215	23.6	
Turnout		909	18.7	
Labour hold		Swing		

=== Aughton and Downholland ===
Aughton and Downholland
Party	Candidate	Votes	%	±%
Conservative	David Westley	954	60.7	
Labour	Andrew Johnson	618	39.3	
Majority		336	21.4	
Turnout		1,572	34.0	
Conservative hold		Swing		

=== Aughton Park ===
Aughton Park
Party	Candidate	Votes	%	±%
Conservative	Geoffrey Roberts	682	78.0	
Labour	Stephen Hanlon	192	22.0	
Majority		490	56.0	
Turnout		874	28.3	
Conservative hold		Swing		

=== Bickerstaffe ===
Bickerstaffe
Party	Candidate	Votes	%	±%
Conservative	Patricia Taylor	402	53.7	−8.5
Labour	Paul Cotterill	347	46.3	+8.5
Majority		55	7.4	−17.0
Turnout		749	45.1	
Conservative hold		Swing		

=== Birch Green ===
Birch Green
Party	Candidate	Votes	%	±%
Labour	Jane Roberts	323	84.6	
Conservative	Timothy Edwards	59	15.4	
Majority		264	69.2	
Turnout		382	12.9	
Labour hold		Swing		

=== Derby ===
Derby
Party	Candidate	Votes	%	±%
Conservative	David Swiffen	618	47.5	
Labour	Noel Delaney	541	41.6	
Green	Anne Doyle	141	10.8	
Majority		77	5.9	
Turnout		1,300	28.2	
Conservative hold		Swing		

=== Digmoor ===
Digmoor
Party	Candidate	Votes	%	±%
Labour	Ann-Marie Maguire	394	75.5	
Independent	Alan Spears	74	14.2	
Conservative	Richard Shepherd	54	10.3	
Majority		220	61.3	
Turnout		522	16.4	
Labour hold		Swing		

=== Knowsley ===
Knowsley
Party	Candidate	Votes	%	±%
Conservative	Robert Bailey	730	56.6	
Labour	Margaret Pinnington	415	32.2	
Green	John Watt	145	11.2	
Majority		315	24.4	
Turnout		1,290	28.4	
Conservative hold		Swing		

=== North Meols ===
North Meols
Party	Candidate	Votes	%	±%
Conservative	Jill Baldock	386	48.9	
Independent	Joan Draper	286	36.2	
Labour	Jane McDermott	117	14.8	
Majority		100	12.7	
Turnout		789	24.7	
Conservative hold		Swing		

=== Parbold ===
Parbold
Party	Candidate	Votes	%	±%
Conservative	May Blake	749	58.8	
Independent	Rosalind Wess	341	26.8	
Labour	Clare Gillard	183	14.4	
Majority		408	32.0	
Turnout		1,273	40.3	
Conservative hold		Swing		

=== Scarisbrick ===
Scarisbrick
Party	Candidate	Votes	%	±%
Conservative	Margaret Edwards	560	72.0	
Labour	David Evans	218	28.0	
Majority		342	44.0	
Turnout		778	26.6	
Conservative hold		Swing		

=== Scott ===
Scott
Party	Candidate	Votes	%	±%
Labour	Allison Sinton	582	38.3	
Conservative	Cyril Ainscough	574	37.7	
Independent	John Fillis	221	14.5	
Green	Maurice George	144	9.5	
Majority		8	0.6	
Turnout		1,521	32.5	
Labour gain from Conservative		Swing		

=== Skelmersdale North ===
Skelmersdale North
Party	Candidate	Votes	%	±%
Labour	Richard Nolan	450	61.1	
Independent	Joan Morrison	195	26.5	
Conservative	Graham Jones	92	12.5	
Majority		255	34.6	
Turnout		737	23.5	
Labour hold		Swing		

=== Skelmersdale South ===
Skelmersdale South
Party	Candidate	Votes	%	±%
Labour	Doreen Saxon	682	73.8	
Conservative	Susan Cropper	131	14.2	
Green	Martin Lowe	111	12.0	
Majority		551	59.6	
Turnout		924	18.6	
Labour hold		Swing		

=== Tanhouse ===
Tanhouse
Party	Candidate	Votes	%	±%
Labour	William Roberts	368	76.3	
Conservative	Irene O'Donnell	114	23.7	
Majority		254	52.6	
Turnout		482	16.3	
Labour hold		Swing		

=== Tarleton ===
Tarleton
Party	Candidate	Votes	%	±%
Conservative	Rosemary Evans	957	59.3	
Independent	John Hodson	658	40.7	
Majority		299	18.6	
Turnout		1,615	37.0	
Conservative hold		Swing		

=== Up Holland ===
Up Holland
Party	Candidate	Votes	%	±%
Labour	Anthony Rice	812	55.2	
Conservative	Ruth Pollock	659	44.8	
Majority		253	10.4	
Turnout		1,471	30.3	
Labour hold		Swing		

=== Wrightington ===
Wrightington
Party	Candidate	Votes	%	±%
Labour	Derek Thompson	638	50.8	
Conservative	Carolyn Evans	618	49.2	
Majority		20	1.6	
Turnout		1,256	37.2	
Labour gain from Conservative		Swing		
