= 2023 West Lancashire Borough Council election =

2023 English local election

← 2022	4 May 2023	2024 →

All 45 seats on West Lancashire Borough Council 23 seats needed for a majority

	First party	Second party
Leader	Yvonne Gagen	David Westley
Party	Labour	Conservative
Seats before	25	20
Seats after	26	15
	Third party	Fourth party
Leader	Adrian Owens
Party	OWL	Independent
Seats before	7 (Note: Including one vacant seat in the old Derby ward which had been held by Our West Lancashire councillor Ian Davis until his death in April 2023.)	2
Seats after	4	0
- Results by ward
Leader before election
Yvonne Gagen
Labour
No overall control
Leader after election
Yvonne Gagen
Labour

The 2023 West Lancashire Borough Council election took place on 4 May 2023, to elect all 45 members of West Lancashire Borough Council in Lancashire, England. The council is usually elected in thirds, but the whole council was up for election in 2023 following changes to ward boundaries, which reduced the number of councillors from 54 to 45.

== Background ==
A parliamentary by-election in the constituency of the same name in February 2023 saw Labour's candidate Ashley Dalton elected on a 10% swing.

== Overview ==
Prior to the election the council was under no overall control, being led by a Labour minority administration.

Following the results, the Labour Party won the council from no overall control.

== Ward results ==
=== Aughton & Holborn ===
Aughton & Holborn
Party	Candidate	Votes	%	±%
Labour	Sarah Lawton	1,216	51.3	
Labour	Paul Hennessy	1,215	51.2	
Labour	Kerry Lloyd	1,178	49.7	
Conservative	David O'Toole	1,050	44.3	
Conservative	Bruce Porteous	1,035	43.6	
Conservative	Doreen Stephenson	989	41.7	
Turnout		2,372	37	
Labour win (new seat)				
Labour win (new seat)				
Labour win (new seat)				

=== Burscough Bridge & Rufford ===
Burscough Bridge & Rufford
Party	Candidate	Votes	%	±%
Conservative	John Gordon	1,043	52.4	
Conservative	Eddie Pope	1,024	51.5	
Conservative	Jayne Rear	939	47.2	
Labour	Sophia Hennessy	787	39.5	
Labour	Mary Jones	769	38.6	
Labour	Pinar Robinson	676	34.0	
Liberal Democrats	Ruxandra-Mihaela Trandafoiu	231	11.6	
Turnout		1,990	35	
Conservative win (new seat)				
Conservative win (new seat)				
Conservative win (new seat)				

=== Burscough Town ===
Burscough Town
Party	Candidate	Votes	%	±%
Labour	Patricia Burnside	885	50.9	
Labour	Andrew Fowler	823	47.4	
OWL	Paul Hesketh	776	44.7	
Labour	Damian Owen	750	43.2	
Conservative	Jason Grice	421	24.2	
Conservative	Richard Ainsworth	323	18.6	
Liberal Democrats	Neil Pollington	215	12.4	
Conservative	Dan Rear	208	12.0	
Turnout		1,737	33	
Labour win (new seat)				
Labour win (new seat)				
OWL win (new seat)				

=== North Meols & Hesketh Bank ===
North Meols & Hesketh Bank
Party	Candidate	Votes	%	±%
Conservative	John Howard	954	58.2	
Conservative	Thomas De Freitas	862	52.6	
Conservative	Ian Eccles	845	51.6	
Labour	Cynthia Dereli	459	28.0	
Labour	George Oliver	408	24.9	
Labour	Gavin Jones-Verity	390	23.8	
Liberal Democrats	Karen Taylor	230	14.0	
Green	Edwin Black	206	12.6	
Turnout		1,638	29	
Conservative win (new seat)				
Conservative win (new seat)				
Conservative win (new seat)				

=== Old Skelmersdale ===
Old Skelmersdale
Party	Candidate	Votes	%	±%
Labour	Neil Furey	1,167	80.2	
Labour	Nicola Pryce-Roberts	1,041	71.5	
Labour	Donna West	1,029	70.7	
Conservative	Keith Ashcroft	176	12.1	
Conservative	Ruth Melling	166	11.4	
Conservative	Juliana Gudgeon	157	10.8	
Turnout		1,455	23	
Labour win (new seat)				
Labour win (new seat)				
Labour win (new seat)				

=== Ormskirk East ===
Ormskirk East
Party	Candidate	Votes	%	±%
Labour	Nicola Hennessy	1,211	51.4	
Labour	Robert Molloy	1,057	44.9	
Labour	Adam Yates	1,022	43.4	
OWL	Janet Ingman	1,011	42.9	
OWL	Gordon Johnson	969	41.1	
OWL	Adrian Owens	954	40.5	
Conservative	Linda Gresty	168	7.1	
Conservative	Kate Maughan	167	7.1	
Conservative	Dave Meadows	163	6.9	
Turnout		2,355	39	
Labour win (new seat)				
Labour win (new seat)				
Labour win (new seat)				

=== Ormskirk West ===
Ormskirk West
Party	Candidate	Votes	%	±%
Labour	Mark Anderson	1,073	49.9	
Labour	Gareth Dowling	1,055	49.0	
Labour	Anne Fennell	1,053	49.0	
OWL	Jane Thompson	882	41.0	
OWL	Kate Mitchell	874	40.6	
OWL	John Evans	771	35.8	
Conservative	Laura Sampson	178	8.3	
Conservative	Sarah Westley	167	7.8	
Conservative	Bill Witter	145	6.7	
Turnout		2,151	35	
Labour win (new seat)				
Labour win (new seat)				
Labour win (new seat)				

=== Rural North East ===
Rural North East
Party	Candidate	Votes	%	±%
Conservative	Rob Bailey	1,182	48.1	
Conservative	Katie Juckes	1,059	43.1	
Conservative	David Whittington	1,023	41.7	
Labour	Margaret Blake	891	36.3	
Labour	Stephen Kirrelly	766	31.2	
Labour	Michael Paris	751	30.6	
OWL	Neil Pye	480	19.5	
Liberal Democrats	John Puddifer	383	15.6	
Liberal Democrats	Peter Chandler	299	12.2	
Turnout		2,456	40	
Conservative win (new seat)				
Conservative win (new seat)				
Conservative win (new seat)				

=== Rural South ===
The election in Rural South ward was delayed until 22nd June as a result of the death of one of the candidates.

Rural South
Party	Candidate	Votes	%	±%
OWL	Ian Rigby	704	48.0	
OWL	Linda Webster	674	46.0	
OWL	Thomas Marsh-Pritchard	664	45.3	
Labour	Julie Gibson	486	33.2	
Labour	Ian Moran	485	33.1	
Labour	Paul Dickie	479	32.7	
Conservative	Sangeeta Naraen	241	16.4	
Conservative	Paul Turpin	233	15.9	
Conservative	Asheem Naraen	226	15.4	
Turnout		1,466	28	
OWL win (new seat)				
OWL win (new seat)				
OWL win (new seat)				

=== Rural West ===
Rural West
Party	Candidate	Votes	%	±%
Conservative	Alex Blundell	765	43.6	
Conservative	Jane Marshall	684	39.0	
Conservative	Marilyn Westley	670	38.2	
Labour	Michael Brooks	655	37.3	
Labour	Pauline Gamester	625	35.6	
Labour	John Watt	596	33.9	
OWL	Richard Brown	569	32.4	
Turnout		1,756	31	
Conservative win (new seat)				
Conservative win (new seat)				
Conservative win (new seat)				

=== Skelmersdale North ===
Skelmersdale North
Party	Candidate	Votes	%	±%
Labour	Yvonne Gagen	998	79.6	
Labour	Terence Devine	975	77.8	
Labour	Melissa Parlour	915	73.0	
Conservative	Jason Chapman	168	13.4	
Conservative	Sue Janvier	142	11.3	
Conservative	Nigel Fielding	138	11.0	
Turnout		1,254	22	
Labour win (new seat)				
Labour win (new seat)				
Labour win (new seat)				

=== Skelmersdale South ===
Skelmersdale South
Party	Candidate	Votes	%	±%
Labour	Terence Aldridge	974	76.2	
Labour	Victoria Cummins	922	72.1	
Labour	Julian Finch	828	64.7	
Skelmersdale Independents	Aaron Body	245	19.2	
Conservative	Malcolm Hayman	94	7.3	
Conservative	Jean Ross	92	7.2	
Conservative	Ian White	87	6.8	
Turnout		1,279	22	
Labour win (new seat)				
Labour win (new seat)				
Labour win (new seat)				

=== Tanhouse & Skelmersdale Town Centre ===
Tanhouse & Skelmersdale Town Centre
Party	Candidate	Votes	%	±%
Labour	Carl Coughlan	925	78.2	
Labour	Paul Hogan	920	77.8	
Labour	Maureen Nixon	902	76.2	
Conservative	Sue Brake	151	12.8	
Conservative	Gillian Taylor	136	11.5	
Conservative	William Cropper	135	11.4	
Turnout		1,183	19	
Labour win (new seat)				
Labour win (new seat)				
Labour win (new seat)				

=== Tarleton Village ===
Tarleton Village
Party	Candidate	Votes	%	±%
Conservative	Joan Witter	1,082	59.2	
Conservative	Darren Daniels	992	54.2	
Conservative	David Westley	987	54.0	
Labour	Janice Monaghan	578	31.6	
Labour	Noel Delaney	512	28.0	
Labour	Christopher Sawyer	509	27.8	
Liberal Democrats	Tina Stringfellow	378	20.7	
Turnout		1,829	33	
Conservative win (new seat)				
Conservative win (new seat)				
Conservative win (new seat)				

=== Up Holland ===
Up Holland
Party	Candidate	Votes	%	±%
Labour	John Fillis	1,128	65.8	
Labour	Suresh Patel	1,097	64.0	
Labour	Gaynar Owen	1,063	62.0	
Conservative	James Dorling	463	27.0	
Conservative	Julie Peel	447	26.1	
Conservative	John Mee	392	22.9	
Turnout		1,714	29	
Labour win (new seat)				
Labour win (new seat)				
Labour win (new seat)				
