= 2007 West Lancashire District Council election =

2007 UK local government election

Results of the 2007 West Lancashire Borough Council election

The 2007 West Lancashire District Council election took place on 3 May 2007 to elect members of West Lancashire District Council in Lancashire, England. One third of the council was up for election and the Conservative Party stayed in overall control of the council.

After the election, the composition of the council was:

| Party | Seats | ± |
|---|---|---|
| Conservative | 33 | +1 |
| Labour | 21 | -1 |

== Background ==
Before the election the Conservatives had a 10-seat majority over Labour, after gaining 3 seats in the 2006 election. 19 seats were being contested in the election with the Conservative leader of the council, Geoff Roberts, being one of those who were defending seats. The election was seen as mainly being fought just between the Conservative and Labour parties, with the Liberal Democrats only standing in 2 wards.

The Conservatives were expected to remain in control of the council and were targeting the wards of Scott and Wrightington where Labour only had small majorities.

== Election result ==
The Conservatives held control of the council after making a net gain of 1 seat to have a majority of 12 over Labour. They gained the seats of Scott and Wrightington from Labour, but lost Bickerstaffe back to Labour. Overall turnout in the election was 31.5%, down from the 32.2% recorded in 2006.

West Lancashire local election result 2007
| Party | Seats | Gains | Losses | Net gain/loss | Seats % | Votes % | Votes | +/− |
|---|---|---|---|---|---|---|---|---|
| Conservative | 11 | 2 | 1 | +1 | 57.9 | 52.8 | 11,655 | -6.8 |
| Labour | 8 | 1 | 2 | -1 | 42.1 | 37.9 | 8,360 | +3.5 |
| Green | 0 | 0 | 0 | 0 | 0.0 | 3.6 | 786 | -0.9 |
| Liberal Democrats | 0 | 0 | 0 | 0 | 0.0 | 2.7 | 601 | +2.7 |
| Independent | 0 | 0 | 0 | 0 | 0.0 | 1.3 | 292 | -0.2 |
| English Democrat | 0 | 0 | 0 | 0 | 0.0 | 0.9 | 196 | +0.9 |
| UKIP | 0 | 0 | 0 | 0 | 0.0 | 0.9 | 195 | +0.9 |

== Ward results ==
=== Ashurst ===
Ashurst
| Party | Candidate | Votes | % | ±% |
|---|---|---|---|---|
| Labour | Jane Roberts | 700 | 68.2 | −0.1 |
| Conservative | David Rydings | 326 | 31.8 | +0.1 |
| Majority | | 374 | 36.5 | −0.1 |
| Turnout | | 1,026 | 21.1 | −2.0 |
| Labour hold | | Swing | | |

=== Aughton and Downholland ===
Aughton and Downholland
| Party | Candidate | Votes | % | ±% |
|---|---|---|---|---|
| Conservative | David Westley | 1,168 | 72.1 | −3.1 |
| Labour | Nicola Hennessy | 453 | 27.9 | +3.1 |
| Majority | | 715 | 44.1 | −6.3 |
| Turnout | | 1,621 | 35.9 | −0.9 |
| Conservative hold | | Swing | | |

=== Aughton Park ===
Aughton Park
| Party | Candidate | Votes | % | ±% |
|---|---|---|---|---|
| Conservative | Geoffrey Roberts | 888 | 80.8 | +0.9 |
| Labour | Pauline Roughley | 211 | 19.2 | −0.9 |
| Majority | | 677 | 61.6 | +1.8 |
| Turnout | | 1,099 | 35.4 | −0.9 |
| Conservative hold | | Swing | | |

=== Bickerstaffe ===
Bickerstaffe
| Party | Candidate | Votes | % | ±% |
|---|---|---|---|---|
| Labour | Paul Cotterill | 502 | 53.5 | +7.2 |
| Conservative | Robin Cropper | 436 | 46.5 | −7.2 |
| Majority | | 66 | 7.0 | |
| Turnout | | 938 | 53.0 | +7.9 |
| Labour gain from Conservative | | Swing | | |

=== Birch Green ===
Birch Green
| Party | Candidate | Votes | % | ±% |
|---|---|---|---|---|
| Labour | Donna West | 424 | 81.4 | +0.4 |
| Conservative | Malcolm Barron | 97 | 18.6 | −0.4 |
| Majority | | 327 | 62.8 | +0.8 |
| Turnout | | 521 | 16.9 | −10.9 |
| Labour hold | | Swing | | |

=== Derby ===
Derby
| Party | Candidate | Votes | % | ±% |
|---|---|---|---|---|
| Conservative | David Swiffen | 792 | 57.2 | −0.7 |
| Labour | Jonathan Sockett | 367 | 26.5 | +0.2 |
| Green | Anne Doyle | 225 | 16.3 | +0.5 |
| Majority | | 425 | 30.7 | −0.9 |
| Turnout | | 1,384 | 31.1 | −1.1 |
| Conservative hold | | Swing | | |

=== Digmoor ===
Digmoor
| Party | Candidate | Votes | % | ±% |
|---|---|---|---|---|
| Labour | Mary Whitby | 531 | 79.8 | +6.9 |
| Conservative | Susan Cropper | 134 | 20.2 | +8.2 |
| Majority | | 397 | 59.7 | +1.9 |
| Turnout | | 665 | 21.1 | −9.9 |
| Labour hold | | Swing | | |

=== Knowsley ===
Knowsley
| Party | Candidate | Votes | % | ±% |
|---|---|---|---|---|
| Conservative | Robert Bailey | 885 | 55.8 | −6.8 |
| Labour | Alan Williams | 506 | 31.9 | +7.8 |
| Green | John Watt | 196 | 12.4 | −0.9 |
| Majority | | 379 | 23.9 | −14.6 |
| Turnout | | 1,587 | 35.1 | −1.8 |
| Conservative hold | | Swing | | |

=== Newburgh ===
Newburgh
| Party | Candidate | Votes | % | ±% |
|---|---|---|---|---|
| Conservative | Edward Pope | 534 | 72.7 | −6.5 |
| Labour | Jacqueline Citarella | 125 | 17.0 | −3.8 |
| English Democrat | Stephen Garrett | 76 | 10.3 | +10.3 |
| Majority | | 409 | 55.6 | −2.8 |
| Turnout | | 735 | 44.5 | −0.6 |
| Conservative hold | | Swing | | |

=== North Meols ===
North Meols
| Party | Candidate | Votes | % | ±% |
|---|---|---|---|---|
| Conservative | Austin Vickers | 567 | 59.2 | +2.7 |
| Liberal Democrats | Rajni Somaiya | 254 | 26.5 | +26.5 |
| Labour | Christopher Mawdsley | 137 | 14.3 | +2.8 |
| Majority | | 313 | 32.7 | −1.6 |
| Turnout | | 958 | 29.2 | +7.2 |
| Conservative hold | | Swing | | |

=== Parbold ===
Parbold
| Party | Candidate | Votes | % | ±% |
|---|---|---|---|---|
| Conservative | May Blake | 992 | 78.2 | +3.7 |
| Labour | Clare Gillard | 277 | 21.8 | −3.7 |
| Majority | | 715 | 56.3 | +7.3 |
| Turnout | | 1,269 | 40.8 | −0.4 |
| Conservative hold | | Swing | | |

=== Scarisbrick ===
Scarisbrick
| Party | Candidate | Votes | % | ±% |
|---|---|---|---|---|
| Conservative | Andrew Fowler | 614 | 53.3 | −16.2 |
| Independent | Margaret Edwards | 292 | 25.3 | +25.3 |
| Labour | Susan Jones | 158 | 13.7 | −3.3 |
| Green | Sylvia Walmsley | 89 | 7.7 | −5.8 |
| Majority | | 322 | 27.9 | −24.6 |
| Turnout | | 1,153 | 36.5 | −3.2 |
| Conservative hold | | Swing | | |

=== Scott ===
Scott
| Party | Candidate | Votes | % | ±% |
|---|---|---|---|---|
| Conservative | Raymond Hammond | 788 | 47.3 | +0.1 |
| Labour | Katherine Anderson | 572 | 34.3 | −1.3 |
| Green | Maurice George | 187 | 11.2 | +0.4 |
| English Democrat | Kenneth Walters | 120 | 7.2 | 1.7 |
| Majority | | 216 | 13.0 | +1.4 |
| Turnout | | 1,667 | 36.6 | −2.8 |
| Conservative gain from Labour | | Swing | | |

=== Skelmersdale North ===
Skelmersdale North
| Party | Candidate | Votes | % | ±% |
|---|---|---|---|---|
| Labour | Richard Nolan | 669 | 77.3 | +31.6 |
| Conservative | Graham Jones | 197 | 22.7 | +9.2 |
| Majority | | 472 | 54.5 | +49.5 |
| Turnout | | 866 | 27.7 | −9.7 |
| Labour hold | | Swing | | |

=== Skelmersdale South ===
Skelmersdale South
| Party | Candidate | Votes | % | ±% |
|---|---|---|---|---|
| Labour | Doreen Saxon | 889 | 73.2 | −2.8 |
| Conservative | Joanne Rushton | 326 | 26.8 | +2.8 |
| Majority | | 563 | 46.3 | −5.7 |
| Turnout | | 1,215 | 24.0 | +0.3 |
| Labour hold | | Swing | | |

=== Tanhouse ===
Tanhouse
| Party | Candidate | Votes | % | ±% |
|---|---|---|---|---|
| Labour | Sarah Keegan | 412 | 60.5 | −3.9 |
| Conservative | Irene O'Donnell | 180 | 26.4 | +2.5 |
| Green | Martin Lowe | 89 | 13.1 | +1.4 |
| Majority | | 232 | 34.1 | −6.4 |
| Turnout | | 681 | 19.6 | −1.8 |
| Labour hold | | Swing | | |

=== Tarleton ===
Tarleton
| Party | Candidate | Votes | % | ±% |
|---|---|---|---|---|
| Conservative | Rosemary Evans | 1,133 | 69.5 | −16.5 |
| Liberal Democrats | Michael Lonsdale | 347 | 21.3 | +21.3 |
| Labour | Shan Annis | 151 | 9.3 | −4.7 |
| Majority | | 786 | 48.2 | −23.8 |
| Turnout | | 1,631 | 36.7 | +1.4 |
| Conservative hold | | Swing | | |

=== Up Holland ===
Up Holland
| Party | Candidate | Votes | % | ±% |
|---|---|---|---|---|
| Labour | Anthony Rice | 776 | 45.1 | −5.9 |
| Conservative | Ruth Pollock | 749 | 43.5 | −5.5 |
| UKIP | Alan Freeman | 195 | 11.3 | +11.3 |
| Majority | | 27 | 1.6 | −0.4 |
| Turnout | | 1,720 | 34.7 | +3.2 |
| Labour hold | | Swing | | |

=== Wrightington ===
Wrightington
| Party | Candidate | Votes | % | ±% |
|---|---|---|---|---|
| Conservative | Michael Tattersall | 849 | 62.9 | −3.7 |
| Labour | Pauline Bailey | 500 | 37.1 | +3.7 |
| Majority | | 349 | 25.9 | −7.3 |
| Turnout | | 1,349 | 40.2 | −12.5 |
| Conservative gain from Labour | | Swing | | |
