= Our West Lancashire =

Localist group of independent politicians in West Lancashire

- Abbreviation: OWL
- Leader: Adrian Owens
- Deputy Leader: Paul Hesketh
- Founded: February 2015
- Ideology: Localism; Catch-all party
- Colours: Orange
- Slogan: Putting residents first and foremost
- West Lancashire Borough Council: 11 / 45
- Lancashire County Council: 2 / 84

Website
- ourwestlancashire.com

Our West Lancashire (OWL) is a localist political party in West Lancashire, United Kingdom. As of May 2026 it held 11 seats on West Lancashire Borough Council, and the party also holds two seats in West Lancashire on Lancashire County Council.

Our West Lancashire made an agreement with the Conservative Party following the 2026 local elections, with Conservative councillor David Whittington becoming leader of the council, and OWL leader Adrian Owens becoming deputy leader. Additionally, OWL councillor Janet Ingman became mayor of West Lancashire.

== History ==
Our West Lancashire was formed in February 2015 by Adrian Owens, a former Conservative Party councillor, Deputy Leader of West Lancashire Borough Council and candidate for West Lancashire in the 2010 United Kingdom general election, coming second with 17,540 votes, after breaking off from the West Lancashire Conservative group on West Lancashire Borough Council. He was joined by Ian Davis in 2017, who won a by-election on Derby Ward. The group gained a further four seats from Labour on West Lancashire Borough Council in the 2019 election. They cited opposition to housing developments in the local plan as the reason for their wins.

In 2021, Our West Lancashire gained a further seat in Burscough West which led to the council going to No Overall Control. As a result, Our West Lancashire councillor, Gordon Paul Johnson became Mayor of West Lancashire and committee chairs were shared between all three political groups with Labour retaining the Leadership of the council.

In May 2026, Labour lost control of the council as OWL increased to 11 seats, with Labour leader of the council Yvonne Gagen stepping down and being replaced by Conservative David Whittington, with OWL's Adrian Owens elected as deputy. They described the administration as an "arrangement" rather than a coalition.

== Policies ==
Our West Lancashire is a localist party, and claims to "put residents before the party whip". Their policies include reducing the number of councillors on West Lancashire Borough Council from 54 to 36, a reduction of a third. They also propose policies such as "revitalising" Ormskirk town centre, replacing the swimming pools in Skelmersdale and Ormskirk and improving West Lancashire Borough Council's free tree scheme. OWL also publish data on councillors' attendance and publish a yearly alternative budget. In 2022, OWL supported a successful Conservative motion to close the borough council's housing development company, Tawd Valley Developments, saying it was more expensive and less transparent than the alternative of contracting out the building of social housing. In 2024, OWL opposed the closure of Park Pool in Ormskirk and Nye Bevan Swimming Pool in Skelmersdale, and their motion of no confidence in the Labour leadership narrowly lost. They successfully voted to keep the pools open in February 2025. In May 2026, they opposed previous plans to move West Lancashire council offices from Derby Street in Ormskirk to Delf House in Skelmersdale, on the grounds of excess cost and uncertainty around the Local Government Reorganisation planned for 2028.

The group is opposed to the whipping system.

== Electoral performance ==
The group has contested elections successfully on West Lancashire Borough Council and, in 2025 on Lancashire County Council. The group has never contested general elections, although Councillor Adrian Owens, the current Leader of the group, has formerly been a Conservative Party candidate for West Lancashire and South Ribble in the House of Commons.

=== West Lancashire Borough Council ===
Our West Lancashire's first councillor was Councillor Adrian Owens, who broke away from the Conservative Party in 2015. He won re-election in 2016 and 2021. The group gained a second councillor, Ian Davis, in a by-election on the Derby ward in 2017. The group gained a further four councillors – Gordon Johnson, Jane Thompson, Kate Mitchell and Ian Rigby – in the 2019 West Lancashire Borough Council election.

In the 2022 West Lancashire Borough Council election, Ian Davis retained his Derby ward seat but the group failed to win any of the other seats that it contested.

Following the electoral reorganisation of West Lancashire in 2023, reducing the number of councillors from 54 to 45, the party won only one seat in Burscough Town ward. In a deferred election, caused by the death of former OWL councillor Ian Davis before election day, the party won all three seats in Rural South ward, with Ian Rigby, Linda Webster and Thomas Marsh-Pritchard elected. In the 2024 election, Janet Ingman won a seat in Ormskirk East, and OWL leader Adrian Owens was re-elected to the council in Rural South, replacing Thomas Marsh-Pritchard.

In May 2025, Labour councillor Neil Furey defected to OWL, and Gordon Johnson was re-elected to the council in a by-election in Aughton and Holborn in October 2025, replacing independent councillor Kerry Lloyd, bringing the party's total to seven.

In 2026, OWL increased to 11 seats despite a challenge from Reform in many seats, BBC News calling this the "first real test" for OWL. They gained five seats from Labour, who lost all eight they were defending.

=== Lancashire County Council ===
Our West Lancashire has contested elections on Lancashire County Council, on seats in the West Lancashire Borough Council area. The group came third in the Ormskirk and West Lancashire East wards in the 2017 elections. In the 2021 elections, they were second in both wards In 2025, Our West Lancashire won both wards on Lancashire County Council, marking the first time the party was represented at the county level.

== Councillors ==
Date	WLBC seats	LCC seats	Event
2015	1 / 54	0 / 84	Adrian Owens, Conservative Party councillor for Derby, defects and forms Our West Lancashire
29 June 2017	2 / 54	0 / 84	Ian Davis elected in the Derby by-election
2 May 2019	6 / 54	0 / 84	Ian Rigby elected in Bickerstaffe, Gordon Johnson elected in Derby, Kate Mitchell elected in Knowsley, Jane Thompson elected in Scott
6 May 2021	7 / 54	0 / 84	George Clandon elected in Burscough West
April 2023	6 / 54	0 / 84	Ian Davis, councillor for Derby ward, dies
4 May 2023	1 / 45	0 / 84	Council reorganisation; all OWL councillors but George Clandon lose their seats
22 June 2023	4 / 45	0 / 84	Ian Rigby, Linda Webster and Thomas Marsh-Pritchard elected in the delayed Rural South election
2 May 2024	5 / 45	0 / 84	Adrian Owens replaces Thomas Marsh-Pritchard in Rural South, Janet Ingman elected in Ormskirk East
1 May 2025	5 / 45	2 / 84	Adrian Owens and Gordon Paul Johnson elected as first OWL councillors on Lancashire County Council
21 May 2025	6 / 45	2 / 84	Neil Furey, councillor for Old Skelmersdale, defects from Labour to OWL
9 October 2025	7 / 45	2 / 84	Gordon Johnson elected in the Aughton and Holborn by-election
7 May 2026	11 / 45	2 / 84	Michael Crompton, Charles Berry, Jess Riding and Anne Marie Hughes elected

Name	Ward	Took office	Left office
Adrian Owens	Derby	2015	2023
Adrian Owens	Rural South	2024	Incumbent
Ian Davis	Derby	2017	2023
Jane Thompson	Scott	2019	2023
Gordon Paul Johnson	Derby	2019	2023
Gordon Paul Johnson	Aughton and Holborn	2025	Incumbent
Kate Mitchell	Knowsley	2019	2023
Ian Rigby	Bickerstaffe	2019	2023
Ian Rigby	Rural South	2023	Incumbent
George Clandon	Burscough West	2021	2023
Paul Hesketh	Burscough Town	2023	2024
Paul Hesketh	Burscough Bridge and Rufford	2024	Incumbent
Thomas Marsh-Pritchard	Rural South	2023	2024
Linda Webster	Rural South	2023	Incumbent
Janet Ingman	Ormskirk East	2024	Incumbent
Neil Furey	Old Skelmersdale	2025	Incumbent
Anne Marie Hughes	Aughton and Holborn	2026	Incumbent
Jess Riding	Burscough Town	2026	Incumbent
Michael John Crompton	Ormskirk East	2026	Incumbent
Charles Robert Berry	Ormskirk East	2026	Incumbent
