= 2021 West Lancashire Borough Council election =

2021 UK local government election

- 6 May 2021

19 out of 54 seats on West Lancashire Borough Council 28 seats needed for a majority
	First party	Second party
Party	Labour	Conservative
Seats won	9	7
Seats after	26	20
Seat change	▼3	▲1
Popular vote	10,383	8,387
	Third party	Fourth party
Party	OWL	Independent
Seats won	2	1
Seats after	7	1
Seat change	▲1	▲1
Popular vote	2,154	—

Map showing the results of the 2021 West Lancashire Borough Council election

The 2021 West Lancashire Borough Council election took place on 6 May 2021 to elect members of West Lancashire Borough Council in Lancashire, England.

This election was postponed from May 2020 due to the COVID-19 pandemic.

== Results summary ==
2021 West Lancashire Borough Council election
Party	This election			Full council			This election		
Party	Seats	Net	Seats %	Other	Total	Total %	Votes	Votes %	+/−
Labour	9	▼3	47.4	17	26	48.1	10,383	42.9	+4.1
Conservative	7	▲1	36.8	13	20	37.0	8,387	35.1	+2.0
OWL	2	▲1	10.5	5	7	13.0	2,154	8.9	-7.7
Independent	1	▲1	5.3	0	1	1.9	1,321	5.5	+5.2
Skelmersdale Independents	0	Steady	0.0	0	0	0.0	921	3.8	New
Liberal Democrats	0	Steady	0.0	0	0	0.0	745	3.1	New
Green	0	Steady	0.0	0	0	0.0	173	0.7	-2.9
Reform	0	Steady	0.0	0	0	0.0	25	0.1	New

== Ward results ==
=== Ashurst ===
Ashurst
Party	Candidate	Votes	%	±%
Independent	James Upton	1,162	60.4	N/A
Labour	Margaret Blake	608	31.6	−40.7
Conservative	Rachel Bland	98	5.1	−6.9
Liberal Democrats	Peter Chandler	56	2.9	N/A
Majority				
Turnout				
Independent gain from Labour		Swing		

=== Aughton and Downholland ===
Aughton and Downholland
Party	Candidate	Votes	%	±%
Conservative	Paul Turpin	839	46.2	−11.9
Labour	Paul Hennessy	601	33.1	−8.8
OWL	David Gallagher	215	11.8	N/A
Liberal Democrats	David Thomas	137	7.5	N/A
Reform	Nigel Wilson	25	1.4	N/A
Majority				
Turnout				
Conservative hold		Swing		

=== Birch Green ===
Birch Green
Party	Candidate	Votes	%	±%
Labour	Sue Gregson	509	66.7	−22.2
Skelmersdale Independents	Mark Jones	170	22.3	N/A
Conservative	Susan Janvier	84	11.0	−0.1
Majority				
Turnout				
Labour hold		Swing		

=== Burscough East ===
Burscough East
Party	Candidate	Votes	%	±%
Labour Co-op	David Evans	681	48.5	−9.9
Conservative	Julie Baxter	623	44.3	+2.7
Liberal Democrats	Neil Pollington	101	7.2	N/A
Majority				
Turnout				
Labour Co-op hold		Swing		

=== Burscough West ===
Burscough West
Party	Candidate	Votes	%	±%
OWL	George Clandon	649	43.0	N/A
Labour	Andrew Pritchard	507	33.6	−29.1
Conservative	Leon Graham	327	21.7	−15.6
Liberal Democrats	Ruxandra-Mihaela Trandafoiu	27	1.8	N/A
Majority				
Turnout				
OWL gain from Labour		Swing		

=== Derby ===
Derby
Party	Candidate	Votes	%	±%
OWL	Adrian Owens	840	48.1	+6.3
Labour	Kevin Wright	617	35.4	−1.4
Conservative	Lynne Gray	247	14.2	−3.4
Liberal Democrats	Callum Clark	41	2.3	N/A
Majority				
Turnout				
OWL hold		Swing		

=== Digmoor ===
Digmoor
Party	Candidate	Votes	%	±%
Labour	Kevin Wilkie	635	67.3	−25.3
Skelmersdale Independents	Irene Hughes	219	23.2	N/A
Conservative	Susan Brake	89	9.4	+2.0
Majority				
Turnout				
Labour hold		Swing		

=== Halsall ===
Halsall
Party	Candidate	Votes	%	±%
Conservative	Denise Hirrell	322	52.4	+12.3
Labour	David Heywood	149	24.3	−19.2
Independent	Neil Campbell	124	20.2	N/A
Liberal Democrats	Nick Rekers	19	3.1	N/A
Majority				
Turnout				
Conservative gain from Labour		Swing		

=== Hesketh-with-Becconsall ===
Hesketh-with-Becconsall (2 seats due to by-election)
Party	Candidate	Votes	%	±%
Conservative	Joan Witter	706	64.7	+1.3
Conservative	Ian Eccles	589	54.0	−9.4
Labour	Jane Catterall	232	21.3	−15.3
Labour	Nicholas Kemp	230	21.1	−15.5
Liberal Democrats	Karen Taylor	103	9.4	N/A
Majority				
Turnout				
Conservative hold				
Conservative hold				

=== Knowsley ===
Knowsley
Party	Candidate	Votes	%	±%
Labour	Adam Yates	881	44.1	−7.4
OWL	Neil Pye	640	32.0	+23.6
Conservative	Ruth Melling	404	20.2	−15.8
Liberal Democrats	Stephen Hunter	74	3.7	N/A
Majority				
Turnout				
Labour hold		Swing		

=== Moorside ===
Moorside
Party	Candidate	Votes	%	±%
Labour	Terence Aldridge	448	62.2	−29.0
Skelmersdale Independents	Aaron Body	157	21.8	N/A
Conservative	Alexander Holcroft	80	11.1	+2.3
Independent	John Carroll	35	4.9	N/A
Majority				
Turnout				
Labour hold		Swing		

=== Rufford ===
Rufford
Party	Candidate	Votes	%	±%
Conservative	John Gordon	597	72.7	+1.2
Labour	Jude Abbott	224	27.3	−1.2
Majority				
Turnout				
Conservative hold		Swing		

=== Scott ===
Scott
Party	Candidate	Votes	%	±%
Labour	Anne Fennell	737	42.8	−0.2
OWL	Blair Piggin	650	37.8	+2.1
Conservative	George Pratt	288	16.7	0.0
Liberal Democrats	Dermot O'Hara	46	2.7	N/A
Majority				
Turnout				
Labour hold		Swing		

=== Skelmersdale North ===
Skelmersdale North
Party	Candidate	Votes	%	±%
Labour	Neil Furey	703	72.8	−16.9
Skelmersdale Independents	Trina Dunn	135	14.0	N/A
Conservative	Julie Peel	127	13.2	+2.9
Majority				
Turnout				
Labour hold		Swing		

=== Skelmersdale South ===
Skelmersdale South
Party	Candidate	Votes	%	±%
Labour	Donna West	828	64.1	−17.2
Skelmersdale Independents	Leonie Goldson	240	18.6	N/A
Conservative	Carolyn Evans	224	17.3	+7.1
Majority				
Turnout				
Labour hold		Swing		

=== Tarleton ===
Tarleton
Party	Candidate	Votes	%	±%
Conservative	Darren Daniels	1,385	72.4	+5.0
Labour	Damien Owen	386	20.2	−12.4
Liberal Democrats	Tina Stringfellow	141	7.4	N/A
Majority				
Turnout				
Conservative hold		Swing		

=== Up Holland ===
Up Holland
Party	Candidate	Votes	%	±%
Labour	Gaynar Owen	982	59.2	−8.6
Conservative	George Rear	678	40.8	+8.6
Majority		304	18.4	
Turnout		1,660		
Labour hold		Swing		

=== Wrightington ===
Wrightington
Party	Candidate	Votes	%	±%
Conservative	Katie Juckles	780	56.7	+3.2
Labour	Catherine West-McGrath	422	30.7	−3.9
Green	John Puddifer	173	12.6	+0.7
Majority				
Turnout				
Conservative hold		Swing		

== By-elections ==
=== North Meols ===
North Meols: 4 November 2021
Party	Candidate	Votes	%	±%
Conservative	John Howard	634	64.9	+15.6
Labour	Elizabeth Savage	343	35.1	−3.0
Majority		291	29.8	
Turnout		980	27.1	
Conservative hold		Swing	▲9.3	
