= West Lancashire =

District of Lancashire, England

Coordinates: 53.562°N 2.827°W

- Borough
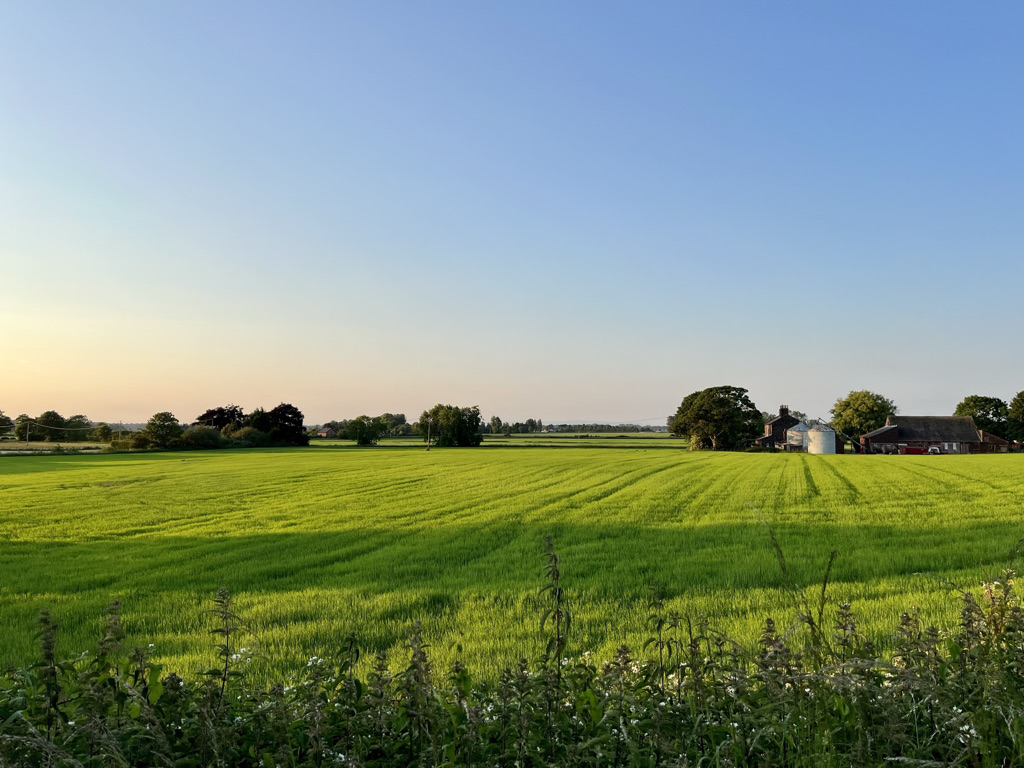
- The West Lancashire plain near Burscough

- Shown within the ceremonial county of Lancashire
- Sovereign state: United Kingdom
- Constituent country: England
- Region: North West England
- Ceremonial county: Lancashire
- Admin. HQ: Ormskirk

Government
  - Type: West Lancashire Borough Council
  - Leadership: Leader and Cabinet
  - MPs: Ashley Dalton (Lab) (West Lancashire); Paul Foster (Lab) (South Ribble)

Area
  - Total: 134 sq mi (347 km^{2})
  - Rank: 102nd

Population (2024)
  - Total: 121,995
  - Rank: Ranked 203rd
  - Density: 911/sq mi (352/km^{2})

Ethnicity (2021)
  - Ethnic groups: List: 96.9% White; 1.3% Mixed; 1.3% Asian; 0.4% other; 0.3% Black

Religion (2021)
  - Religion: List: 61.5% Christianity; 31.5% no religion; 5.6% not stated; 0.4% Islam; 0.3% other; 0.2% Buddhism; 0.2% Hinduism; 0.1% Sikhism; 0.1% Judaism
- Time zone: UTC+0 (Greenwich Mean Time)
  - Summer (DST): UTC+1 (British Summer Time)
- Postcode: L, PR, WN
- ONS code: 30UP (ONS); E07000127 (GSS)

West Lancashire is a local government district with borough status in Lancashire, England. It is located in the south-west of the county and is bordered by Greater Manchester to the east and Merseyside to the south and west. The Lancashire district of Fylde lies the north, over the Ribble Estuary, and South Ribble and Chorley to the east.

The borough has an area of 133.8 square miles (347 km^{2}) and had an estimated population of 121,995 in 2024. It is primarily rural, and the most populous settlements are Ormskirk and Skelmersdale; other settlements include Burscough, Up Holland, and Tarleton. The borough council is based in Ormskirk, and there are twenty-one civil parishes. Employment in the borough is largely in the service sector, with above-average employment in the education sector due to Edge Hill University in Ormskirk. West Lancashire has strong economic links to the Merseyside boroughs of Sefton, St Helens, and Liverpool and the Greater Manchester borough of Wigan.

The west of the borough contains much of the southern part of the Lancashire Plain, a low-lying region of mossland. A large lake called Martin Mere occupied much of the area until it was drained for agriculture. The northern border of the borough is the Ribble Estuary, and both it and the remnant of Martin Mere are Ramsar sites. In the east the land rises to Harrock Hill, Parbold Hill, and Ashurst Hill; the River Douglas flows west through the valley between the last two, then turns north and forms the borough boundary.

== History ==
The district was created on 1 April 1974 under the Local Government Act 1972, covering the whole area of two former districts and parts of another two districts, all of which were abolished at the same time:

- Ormskirk Urban District
- Skelmersdale and Holland Urban District
- West Lancashire Rural District (majority of former district's territory; remainder went to Merseyside)
- Wigan Rural District (parishes of Dalton, Parbold and Wrightington; remainder went to Greater Manchester)

In 2009 the district was awarded borough status, causing the council to change its name from West Lancashire District Council to West Lancashire Borough Council, and allowing the chairman of the council to take the title of mayor.

Under current local government reorganisation plans, all district councils in Lancashire, as well as the county council, will be abolished in 2028, with the district becoming part of a new South Lancashire unitary authority.

== Governance ==
West Lancashire Borough Council

Type
- Type: Non-metropolitan district

Leadership
- Mayor: Janet Ingman, Our West Lancashire since 20 May 2026
- Leader: David Whittington, Conservative since 20 May 2026
- Chief Executive: Chris Sinnott since June 2026

Structure
- Seats: 45 councillors
- Graph of the party split among 45 seats.
- Political groups: Administration (23) Conservative (12) OWL (11) Other parties (22) Labour (13) Reform (7) Independent (2)

Elections
- Last election: 7 May 2026
- Next election: 2027 (TBD)

Meeting place
- 52 Derby Street, Ormskirk, L39 2DF

Website
- www.westlancs.gov.uk

West Lancashire Borough Council provides district-level services. County-level services are provided by Lancashire County Council. Parts of the district are also covered by civil parishes, which form a third tier of local government.

The council employs around 600 people, making it one of West Lancashire's largest employers. It is responsible for the administration of various services, such as leisure, waste collection, planning permission and pest control.

=== Political control ===
The council has been under no overall control since May 2025, with Labour as the largest party. Following the 2026 election, a coalition of the Conservatives and local party Our West Lancashire formed to run the council, led by Conservative councillor David Whittington.

The first election to the council was held in 1973, initially operating as a shadow authority alongside the outgoing authorities until the new arrangements came into effect on 1 April 1974. Political control of the council since 1974 has been as follows:

Party in control	Years
No overall control	1974–1976
Conservative	1976–1986
No overall control	1986–1987
Conservative	1987–1991
No overall control	1991–1994
Labour	1994–2002
Conservative	2002–2014
No overall control (Conservative minority)	2014–2015
Labour	2015–2021
No overall control (Labour minority)	2021–2023
Labour	2023–2025
No overall control (Labour minority)	2025–2026
No overall control (Conservative-Our West Lancashire coalition)	2026–Present

=== Leadership ===
The role of mayor is largely ceremonial in West Lancashire. Political leadership is instead provided by the leader of the council. The leaders since 1994 have been:

Councillor	Party	From	To
Alan Bullen	Labour	May 1994	May 2002
Geoff Roberts	Conservative	May 2002	21 May 2008
Ian Grant	Conservative	21 May 2008	May 2014
David Westley	Conservative	11 Jun 2014	May 2015
Ian Moran	Labour	20 May 2015	May 2022
Yvonne Gagen	Labour	18 May 2022	May 2026
David Whittington	Conservative	20 May 2026	

=== Composition ===
Following the 2026 election, the composition of the council was:

Party	Seats
Labour	13
Conservative	12
OWL	11
Reform	7
Independent	2
Total	45

The next election is due in 2027 (TBD).

=== Premises ===
The council is based at 52 Derby Street in Ormskirk, which was originally a pair of large semi-detached Victorian houses called Beaconsfield (number 52) and Abbotsford (number 54). Beaconsfield was purchased in 1925 by West Lancashire Rural District Council, one of the modern council's predecessors, and converted to become its headquarters, being formally opened on 30 July 1925. Abbotsford was acquired later and the building has been significantly extended to the rear.

=== Elections ===
Since the last boundary changes in 2023 the council has comprised 45 councillors representing 15 wards, with each ward electing three councillors. Elections are held three years out of every four, with a third of the council (one councillor for each ward) being elected each time for a four-year term. Lancashire County Council elections are held in the fourth year of the cycle when there are no borough council elections.

=== Parliamentary constituencies ===
The south of West Lancashire, including the towns of Burscough, Skelmersdale and Ormskirk fall under the West Lancashire constituency in the House of Commons, which has been represented by Labour Party MP Ashley Dalton since the 2023 West Lancashire by-election, whereas the north of West Lancashire falls under the South Ribble constituency, which has been represented by Conservative Party MP Katherine Fletcher since the 2019 general election.

== Geography ==
Towns and villages in West Lancashire

Skelmersdale, a former New Town, and Ormskirk are the two main towns in the borough. These are surrounded by a patchwork of smaller settlements to the west and north.

=== Civil parishes ===
Civil parishes in West Lancashire

There are 21 civil parishes in West Lancashire. The main towns of Skelmersdale and Ormskirk are unparished areas. There is a movement to establish a town council in Skelmersdale. The parish council of Burscough takes the style "town council".

1. Aughton
2. Bickerstaffe
3. Bispham
4. Burscough
5. Dalton
6. Downholland
7. Great Altcar
8. Halsall
9. Hesketh-with-Becconsall
10. Hilldale
11. Lathom
12. Lathom South
13. Newburgh
14. North Meols
15. Parbold
16. Rufford
17. Scarisbrick
18. Simonswood
19. Tarleton
20. Up Holland
21. Wrightington

All the civil parishes have a parish council, with the exception of Bispham, which has a parish meeting instead.

== Media ==
In terms of television, the area is served by BBC North West and ITV Granada broadcasting from the Winter Hill transmitter.

Radio stations for the area are:

- BBC Radio Lancashire
- BBC Radio Merseyside
- Heart North West
- Smooth North West
- Dune Radio
- Greatest Hits Radio Lancashire
- Central Radio North West
- Dune FM

Local newspaper is the Lancashire Telegraph.

== Twin towns ==
West Lancashire is twinned with:

- Cergy-Pontoise, France
- Erkrath, Germany
