= List of places in Lancashire =

Some of the larger settlements of Lancashire.

This is a list of places within the ceremonial county of Lancashire, England.

== A ==
- Abbey Village
- Abbeystead
- Accrington
- Acre
- Adlington
- Aldcliffe
- Altham
- Anderton
- Andertons Mill
- Anglezarke
- Arkholme
- Appley Bridge
- Aspden
- Astley Village
- Aughton

== B ==
- Bacup
- Balderstone
- Bamber Bridge
- Banks
- Barley
- Barnoldswick
- Barrow Nook
- Barrowford
- Barton (Preston)
- Barton (West Lancashire)
- Bashall Eaves
- Baxenden
- Belmont
- Belthorn
- Bickerstaffe
- Billington,
- Bispham
- Bispham Green
- Blackamoor
- Blacko
- Blackburn
- Blackpool
- Bleasdale
- Bolton-by-Bowland
- Bolton-le-Sands
- Borwick
- Bretherton
- Brierfield
- Brindle
- Brinscall
- Brockhall
- Broughton
- Buckshaw Village
- Burnley
- Burscough

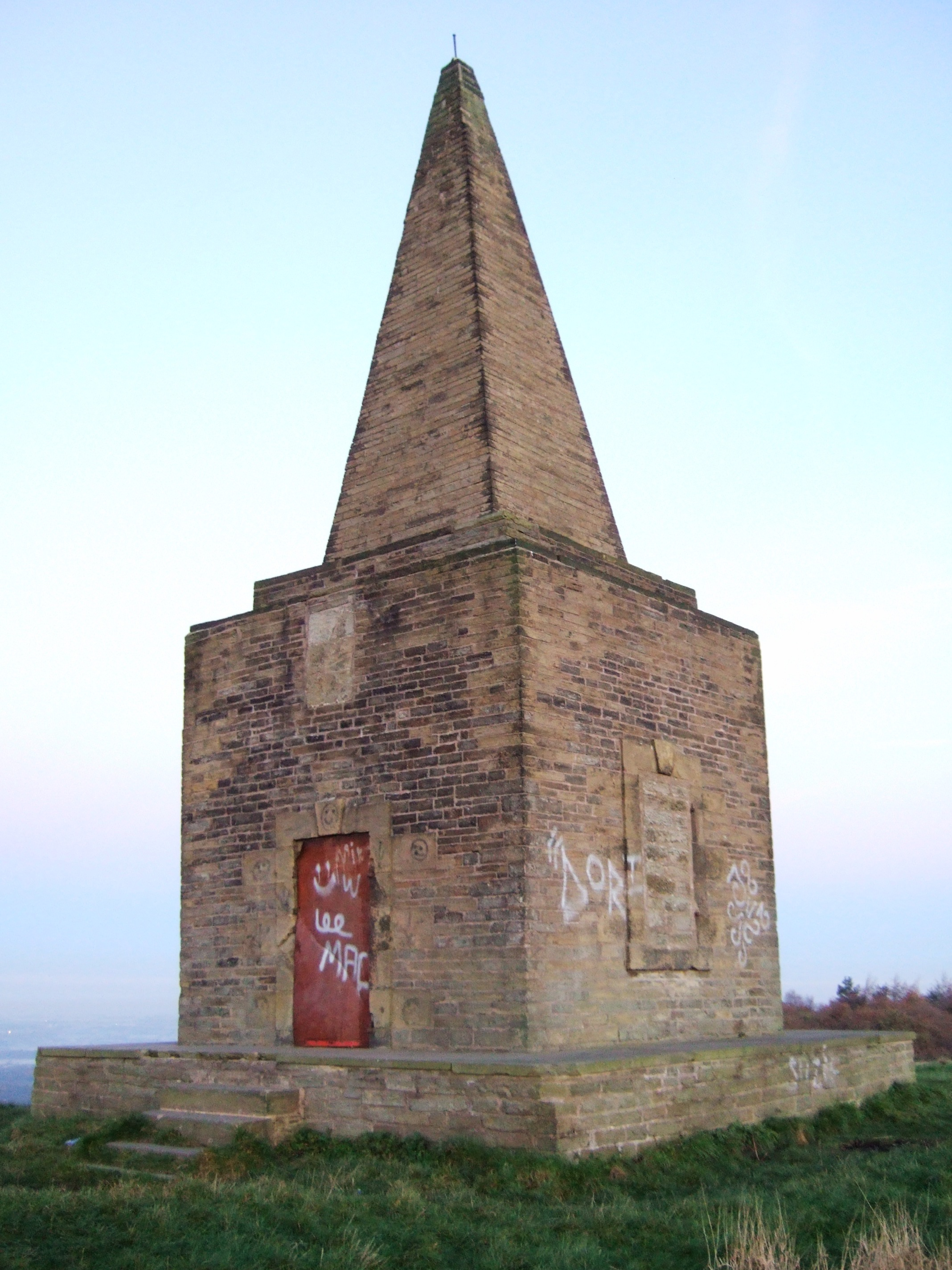
Ashurst Beacon, Dalton

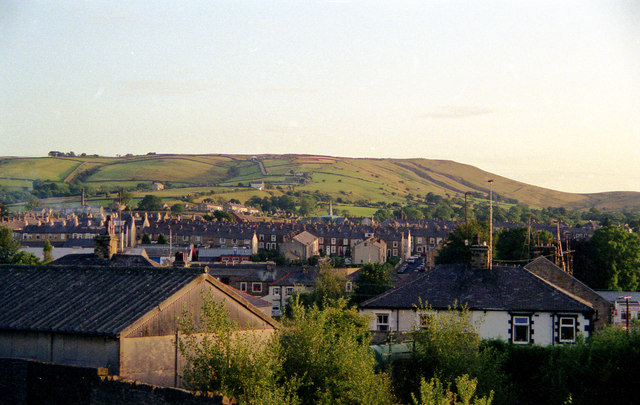
Barnoldswick

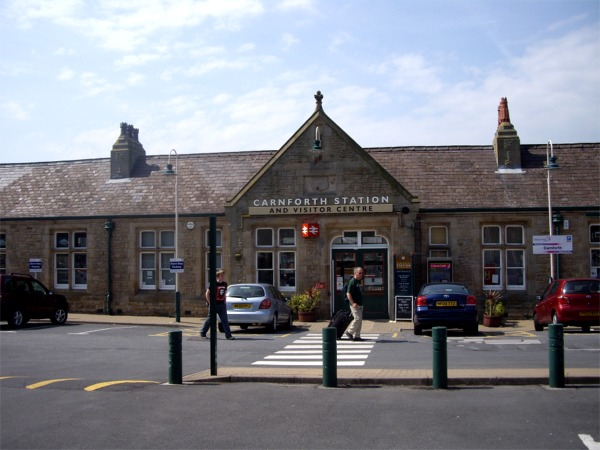
Carnforth Station

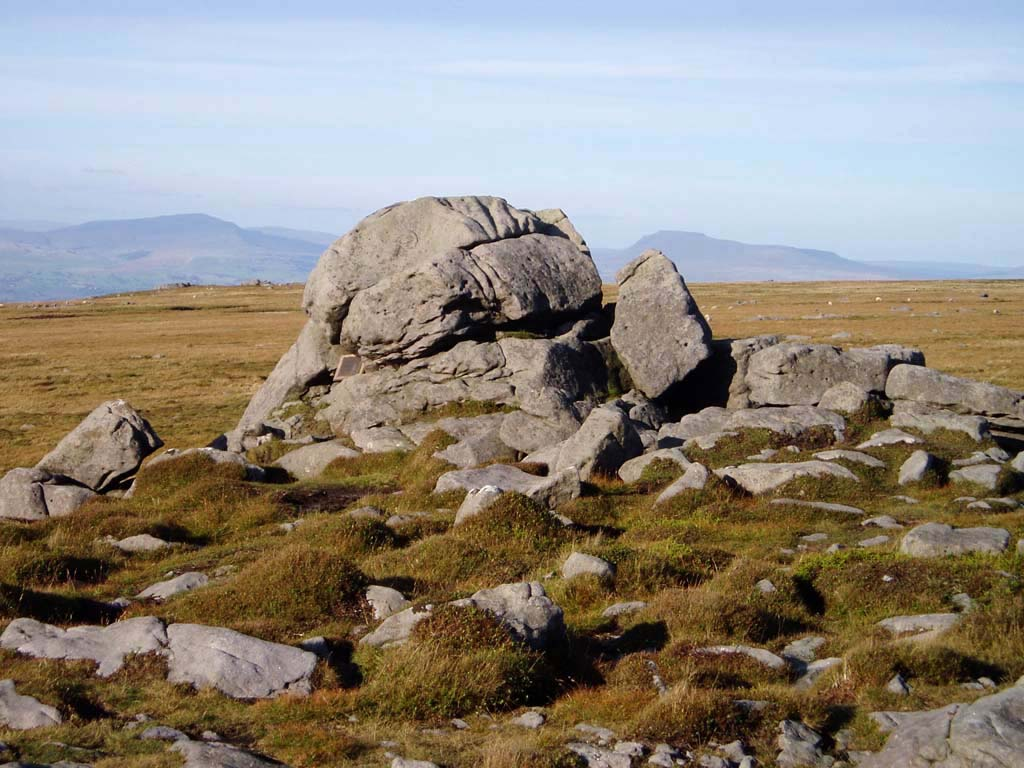
Forest of Bowland, Ward's stone

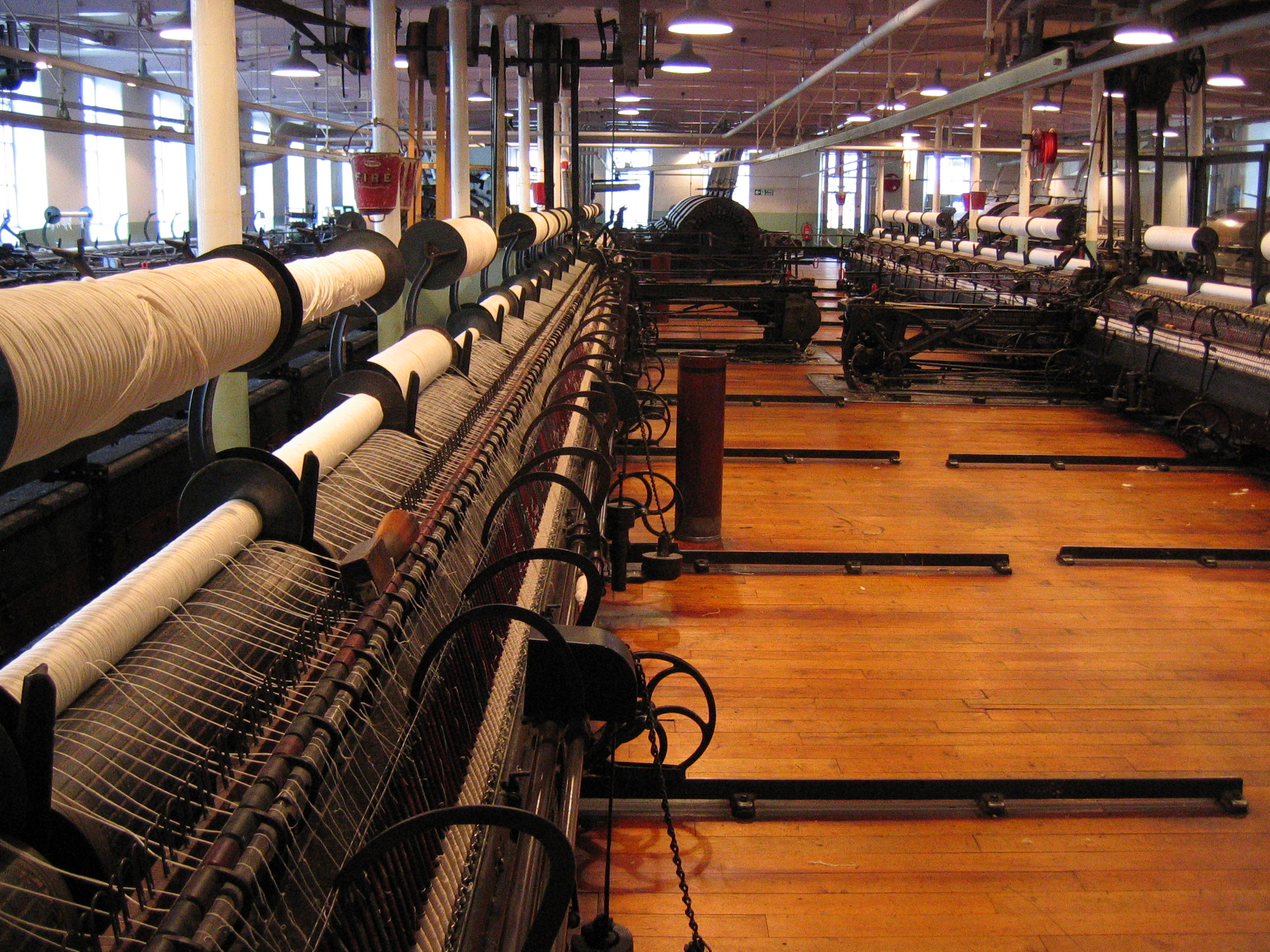
Helmshore Museum

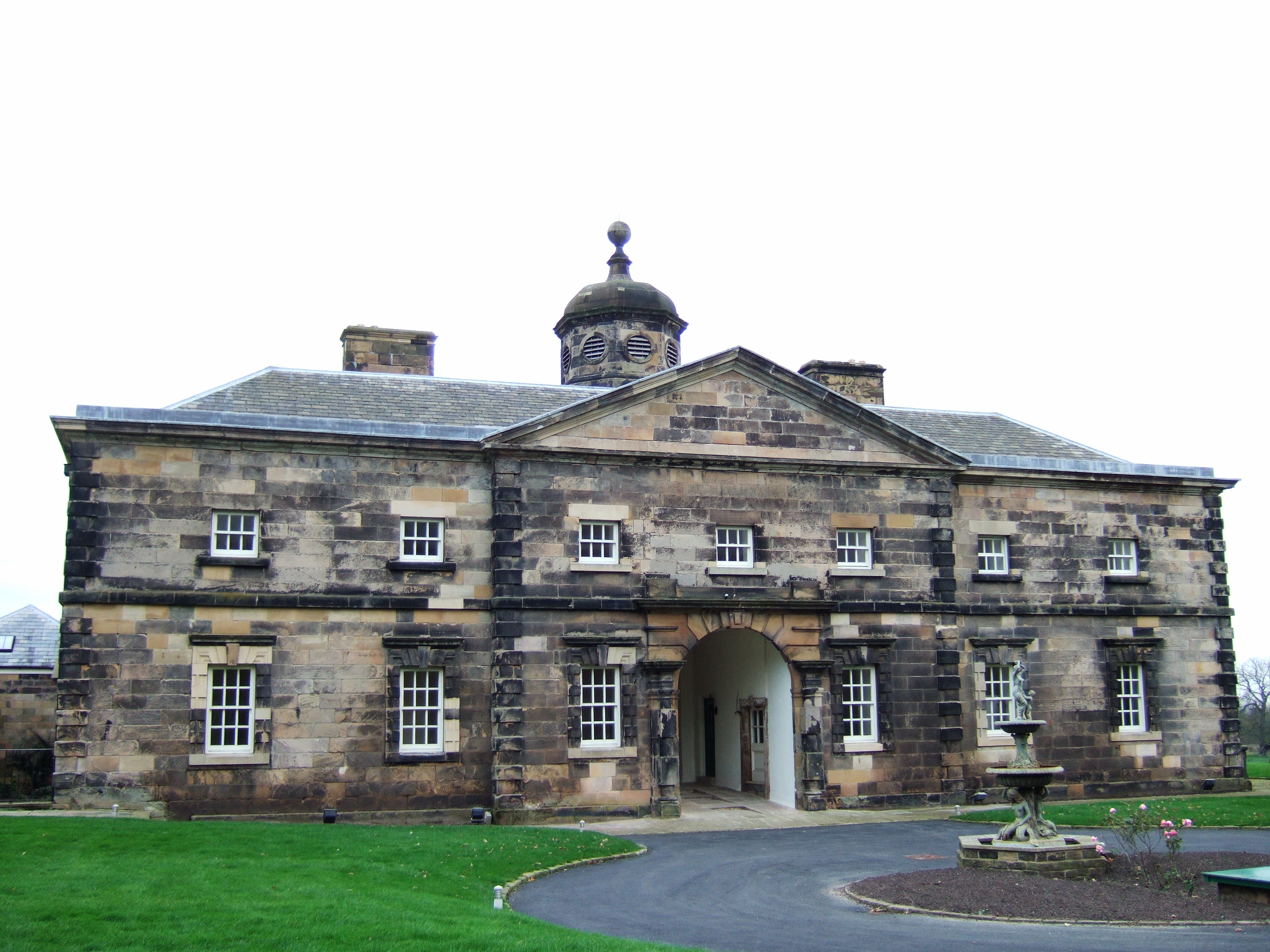
Lathom House, West Wing

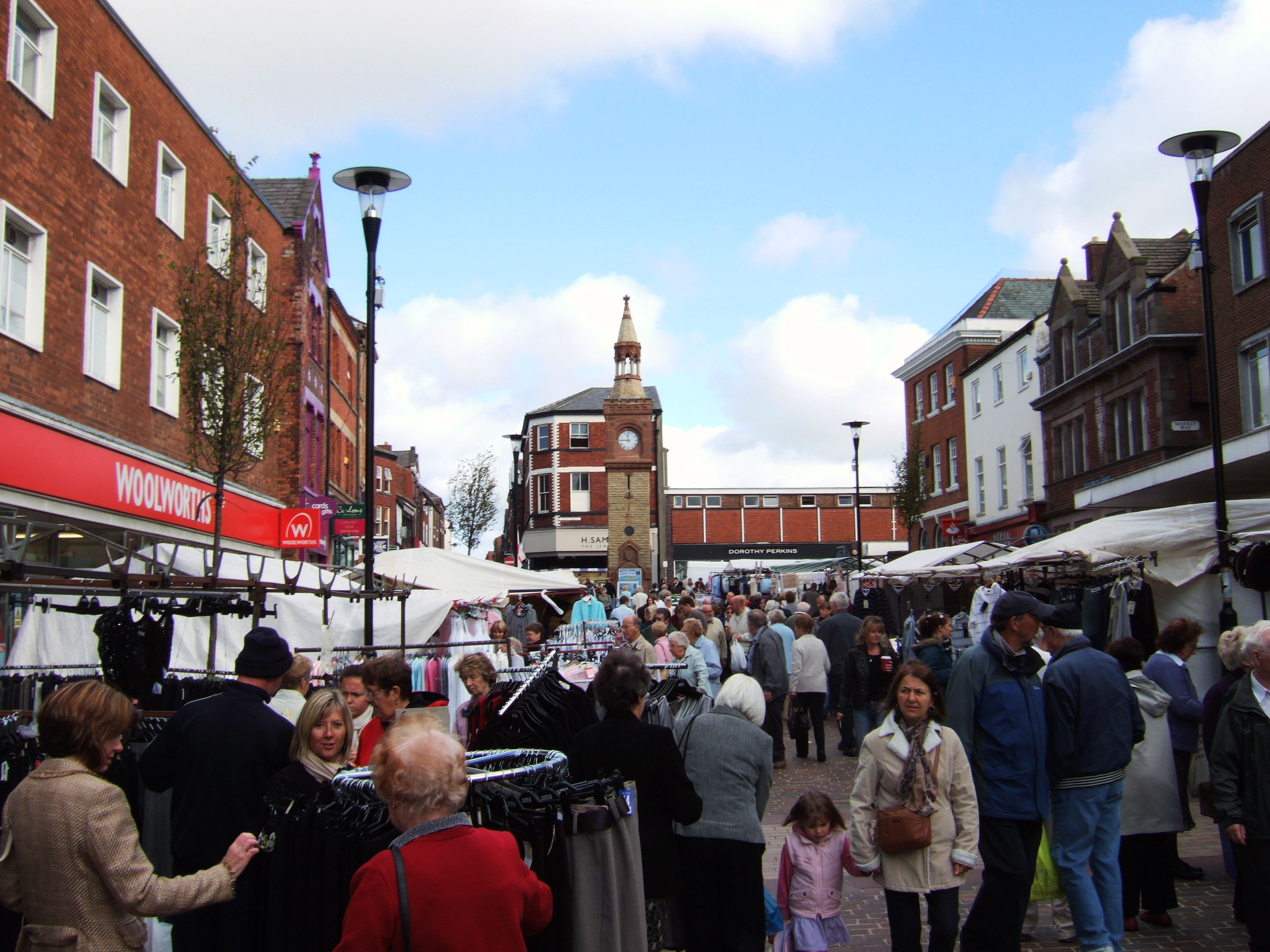
Ormskirk Market

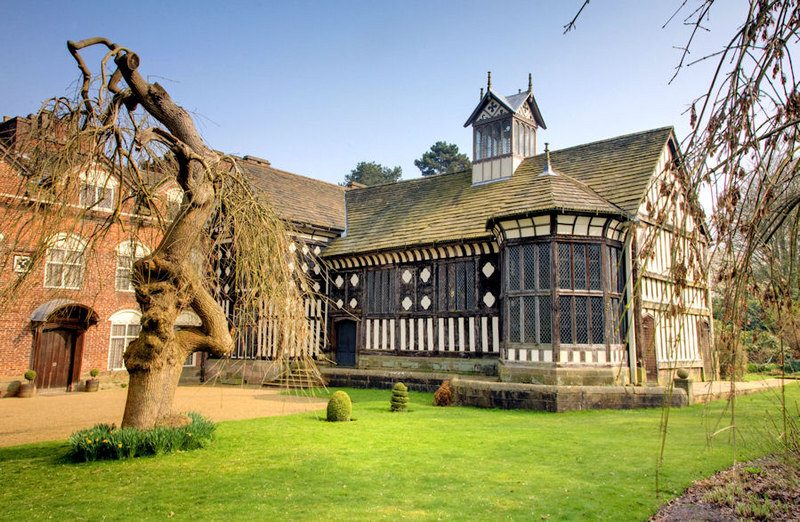
Rufford Old Hall

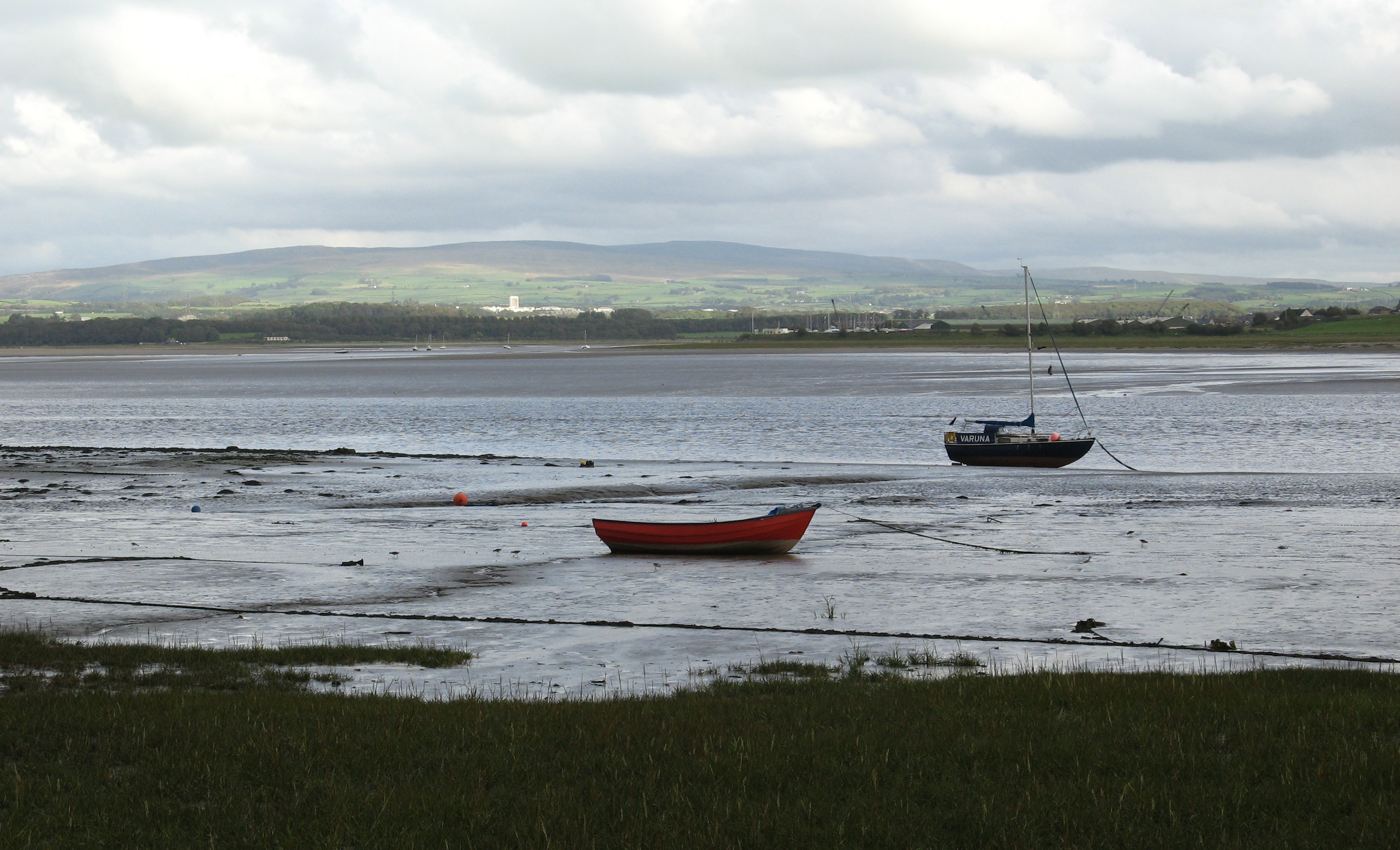
Sunderland Point, River Lune

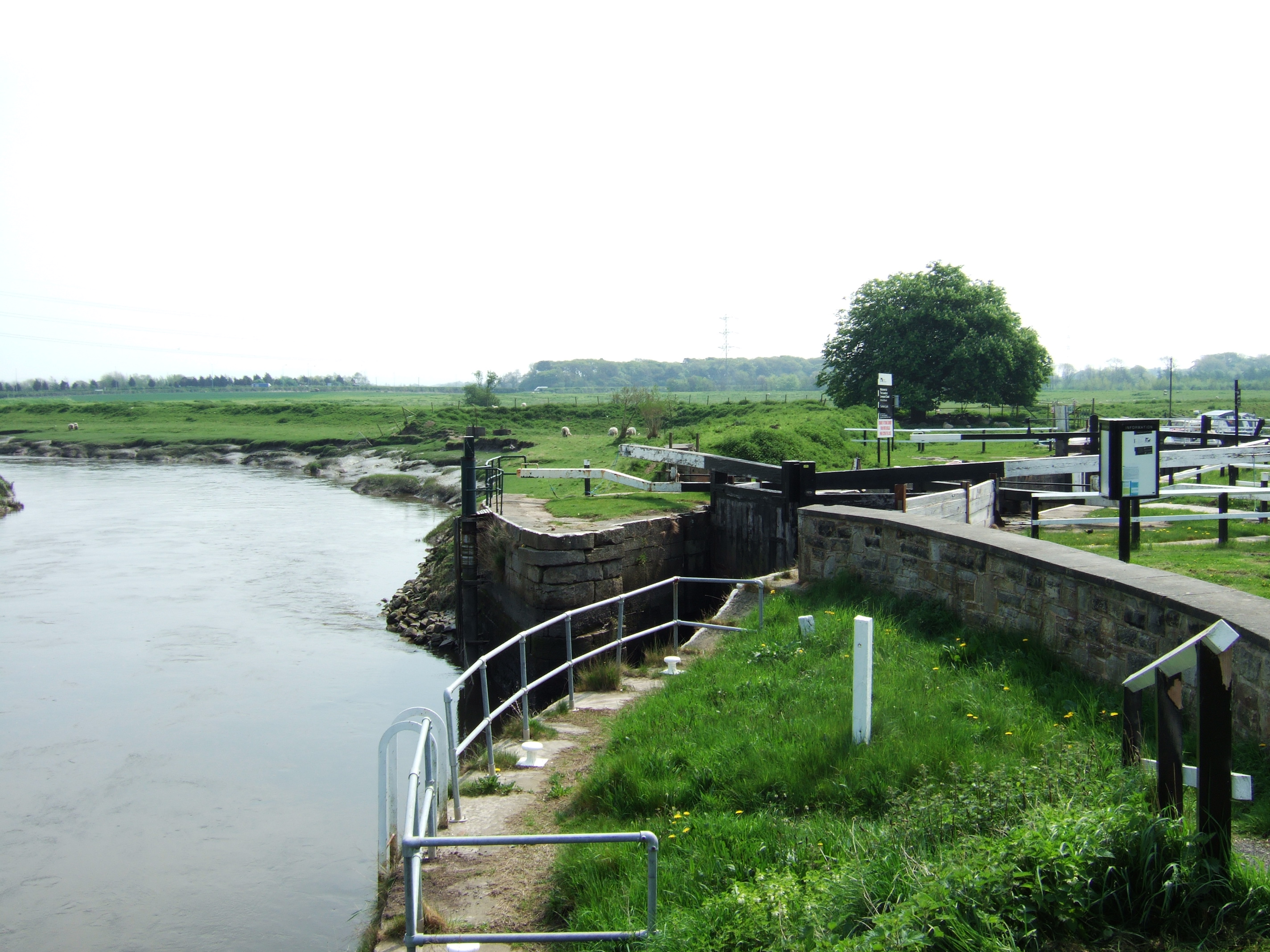
Tarleton Lock, Leeds and Liverpool Canal

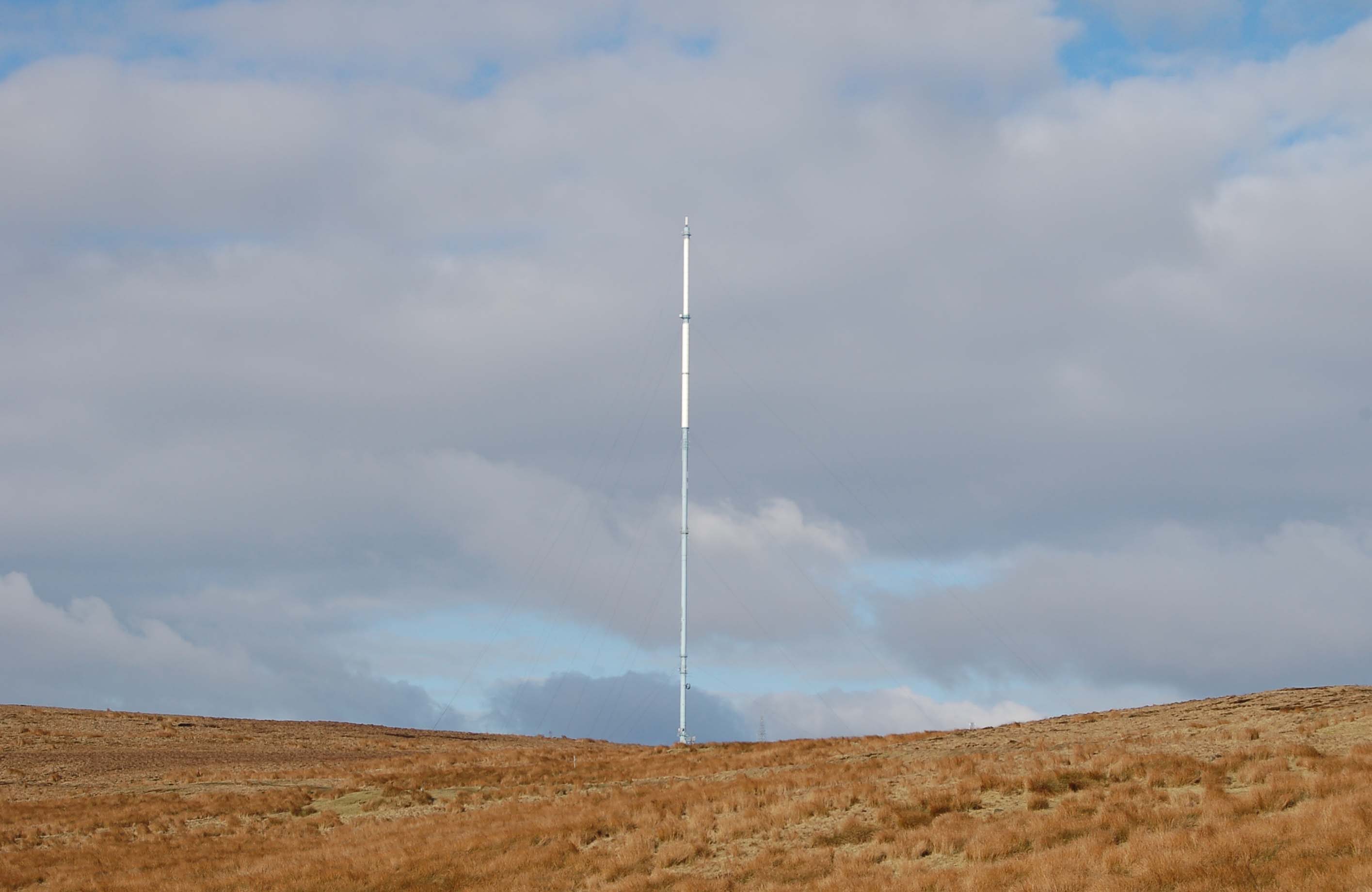
Winter Hill mast

== C ==
- Calder Vale
- Cantsfield
- Carnforth
- Catforth
- Caton
- Catterall
- Chapeltown
- Charnock Richard
- Chatburn
- Chipping
- Chingle Hall
- Chorley
- Church
- Churchtown
- Claughton-on-Brock
- Claughton (Lancaster)
- Clayton-le-Dale
- Clayton-le-Moors
- Clayton-le-Woods
- Clayton Brook
- Cleveleys
- Clifton
- Clitheroe
- Cliviger
- Clowbridge
- Cockerham
- Colne
- Conder Green
- Coppull
- Copster Green
- Corner Row
- Cottam
- Cottontree
- Coupe Green
- Cowan Bridge
- Crawford
- Crawshawbooth
- Croston
- Cuerden

== D ==
- Dalton
- Darwen
- Dinckley
- Dolphinholme
- Downholland Cross
- Drummersdale

== E ==
- Earby
- Eccleston
- Edenfield
- Edgworth
- Elswick
- Esprick
- Euxton

== F ==
- Facit
- Farington
- Farleton
- Feniscowles
- Fleetwood
- Foulridge
- Freckleton
- Fulwood

== G ==
- Galgate
- Garstang
- Gisburn
- Glasson Dock
- Goosnargh
- Great Altcar
- Great Eccleston
- Great Harwood
- Great Mitton
- Greenhalgh
- Gregson Lane
- Gressingham
- Grimsargh
- Grindleton

== H ==
- Haggate
- Halsall
- Halton
- Hambleton
- Haskayne
- Haslingden
- Heapey
- Heath Charnock
- Helmshore
- Hesketh Bank
- Hest Bank
- Heysham
- Higham
- Higher Booths
- Higher Walton
- Higher Wheelton
- Hilldale
- Hoddlesden
- Hoghton
- Holmes
- Holmeswood
- Hornby
- Hoscar Moss
- Hothersall
- Howick Cross
- Huncoat
- Hundred End
- Hutton

== I ==
- Inglewhite
- Ingol
- Inskip

== K ==
- Kelbrook
- Kirkham
- Knott End-on-Sea

== L ==
- Lancaster
- Laneshaw Bridge
- Langho
- Larbreck
- Lathom
- Lea
- Lea Town
- Leyland
- Little Eccleston
- Little Harwood
- Longridge
- Longton
- Lostock Hall
- Livesey
- Lower Darwen
- Lytham

== M ==
- Mawdesley
- Medlar-with-Wesham
- Melling
- Mellor
- Mellor Brook
- Mere Brow
- Midge Hall
- Middleton
- Morecambe
- Moss Side (Leyland)
- Moss Side (Fylde)
- Much Hoole
- Myerscough

== N ==
- Nelson
- Nether Burrow
- Nether Kellet
- Newburgh
- Newchurch (Rossendale)
- Newchurch in Pendle
- Newsholme
- Newton-in-Bowland
- Newton-with-Scales

== O ==
- Oakenshaw
- Ormskirk
- Osbaldeston
- Oswaldtwistle
- Over Kellet
- Overton
- Overtown
- Over Wyre

Oldham))

== P ==
- Padiham
- Parbold
- Paythorne
- Pendleton
- Penwortham
- Pickup Bank
- Pilling
- Pleasington
- Poulton-le-Fylde
- Preesall
- Preston
- Priest Hutton

== Q ==
- Quernmore

== R ==
- Ramsgreave
- Rawtenstall
- Read
- Ribbleton
- Ribchester
- Riley Green
- Rimington
- Rishton
- Rivington
- Roby Mill
- Rossendale
- Rufford

== S ==
- Sabden
- St Annes
- Salesbury
- Salterforth
- Salwick
- Samlesbury
- Sawley
- Scarisbrick
- Scorton
- Shawforth
- Shirdley Hill
- Silverdale
- Simonswood
- Singleton
- Skelmersdale
- Slaidburn
- Slyne
- Sollom
- Sough
- Squires Gate
- Staining
- Stalmine
- Stanhill
- Stubbins
- Sunderland Point

== T ==
- Tarlscough
- Tarleton
- Tatham
- Tewitfield
- Thistleton
- Thornton
- Thurnham
- Tockholes
- Tottleworth
- Trawden
- Treales, Roseacre and Wharles
- Tunstall

== U ==
- Upholland
- Ulnes Walton

== W ==
- Waddington
- Walton-le-Dale
- Warton (Fylde)
- Warton (Lancaster)
- Waterfoot
- Weeton
- Wennington
- Wesham
- West Bradford
- Westhead
- Whalley
- Whalley Range
- Wheelton
- Whitechapel
- White Coppice
- Whitestake
- Whitewell
- Whittington
- Whittle-le-Woods
- Whitworth
- Wilpshire
- Winewall
- Wiswell
- Withnell
- Withnell Fold
- Woodplumpton
- Worsthorne
- Wray
- Wrea Green
- Wrightington

== Y ==
- Yealand Conyers
- Yealand Redmayne
- Yealand Storrs

== See also ==
- List of settlements in Lancashire by population
- Civil parishes in Lancashire
- List of places historically in Lancashire for pre-1974 boundaries
- List of places in England for lists in other counties
