= Listed buildings in Tarleton =

Tarleton is a civil parish in the West Lancashire district of Lancashire, England. It contains 19 buildings that are recorded in the National Heritage List for England as designated listed buildings. Of these, one is at Grade II*, the middle grade, and the others are at Grade II, the lowest grade. The parish contains the village of Tarleton, the hamlets of Holmes, Mere Brow and Sollom, and surrounding countryside. The Rufford Branch of the Leeds and Liverpool Canal and the River Douglas pass through the parish, and bridges crossing these are listed. The other listed buildings include farmhouses, farm buildings, other houses, a medieval cross base, a church, a war memorial, and a canal warehouse.

== Key ==
Grade	Criteria
II*	Particularly important buildings of more than special interest
II	Buildings of national importance and special interest

== Buildings ==
Name and location	Photograph	Date	Notes	Grade
Cross base 53.66267°N 2.82580°W	—	Medieval (probable)	The cross base is in gritstone, with a square section, and is about 0.5 metres (1 ft 8 in) high. It is slightly tapered, and has a square socket on the top.	II
Holmeswood Hall; 53.65035°N 2.87545°W		1568	This originated as a hunting or fishing lodge, and was later used as a farmhouse. It is in roughcast brick, and consists of a rectangular three-storey tower with an embattled parapet. There are square windows in the lower two floors, and a casement window in the top floor, where there is also a carved stone plaque that includes the date and initials.	II
4 and 6 Plox Brow; 53.68031°N 2.82841°W	—	17th century or earlier	Originally a farmhouse, later converted into two dwellings, it is cruck-framed and clad in brick. It has three bays with 1 1/2 storeys, and an additional slightly higher bay added to the right with two storeys. No. 6 is rendered and has a gabled half-dormer. Inside No. 6 is a bressumer and a full cruck truss.	II
Mayo Farmhouse; 53.68074°N 2.82734°W		1635	The farmhouse is in rendered brick with a slate roof. It has two storeys and three bays, with an extension at the rear. The first bay is set back, and on the front is a single-storey gabled porch that has a slightly arched outer doorway with an inscribed lintel. All the windows on the front are modern replacements, and in the right gable wall is a partly blocked mullioned window. Inside the house are back-to-back inglenooks with a bressumer, and a timber-framed partition with wattle and daub infill.	II
Cross Farmhouse; 53.66253°N 2.82618°W	—	17th century	The former farmhouse is in brick with a stone-slate roof, and has two storeys and four bays. The windows are sliding sashes with segmental heads, and there are two gabled dormers. Inside the house is an inglenook and a bressumer.	II
Gatcliffe House Farm House; 53.68026°N 2.82947°W	—	17th century	Originally a farmhouse, it is in brick with a concrete tile roof, and has two storeys. The house has an L-shaped plan, with a two-bay front range and a rear wing. The openings on the front have segmental heads, the windows being casements. The left return has two unequal gables, and there is one brick-mullioned window at the rear. Inside the house, in the upper floor, is a timber-framed partition.	II
Manor House Farmhouse; 53.67693°N 2.83254°W	—	17th century	The former farmhouse is in brick on a sandstone plinth with a slate roof, and is in two storeys. It has an L-shaped plan with two bays, the left bay forming a receding gabled cross wing, and a short firehood wing. On the front is a gabled two-storey porch that has a stone lintel and a brick hood mould, above which is a lozenge of blue bricks. Most of the windows are casements and there is one sliding sash window.	II
Webster's Shop, front range 53.67956°N 2.83084°W		17th century (probable)	The former barn is cruck-framed, and has since been converted and used as part of a shop. It is partly clad in brick, and partly attached to extensions. Inside the building are two full cruck trusses.	II
White Dial Farmhouse; 53.66330°N 2.82659°W	—	17th century	Originally a farmhouse, it was altered in the 18th century, and is in rendered brick with a roof of corrugated asbestos sheet. There are two storeys and three bays. The doorway has a wooden canopy, and the windows are modern casements. Inside the house is an inglenook and a bressumer.	II
Topping's Farmhouse; 53.68031°N 2.82704°W	—	1651	A brick farmhouse with a slate roof, in two storeys and three bays and with a service wing to the rear. There is a two-storey porch, and the lintel of the inner doorway is carved with the date. The windows have been altered. Inside the farmhouse is a bressumer.	II
Tarleton Bridge; 53.67619°N 2.81830°W		Late 17th century	The bridge, which was widened in 1821, carries the A59 road over the River Douglas. It is in sandstone and consists of three segmental arches with cutwaters. The bridge also has rusticated voussoirs, an inscribed keystone, parapets with rounded coping, and panelled pilasters.	II
Green Lane Farmhouse; 53.66206°N 2.82636°W	—	c. 1700	A brick farmhouse on a stone plinth with a slate roof. It has two storeys and three bays, with a stair turret at the rear, and a lean-to extension at the right end. All the windows are sliding sashes, and some have segmental heads.	II
St Mary's Church; 53.67480°N 2.82391°W		1719	The church was extended in 1624 and is now redundant. It is in brick with a stone-slate roof and a stone bell-tower. The church has a rectangular plan with a semi-octagonal apse, a rectangular bell-tower surmounted by a rotunda with a ball finial and a weathervane, and a flat-roofed porch. Along the sides are round-headed windows with keystones. On the gables are flaming-urn finials. The porch has a round-headed doorway and windows, and a low parapet. Inside the church is a gallery on the west and south sides.	II*
Barn, Holmeswood Hall; 53.65037°N 2.87526°W		18th century (probable)	The barn, which incorporates earlier fabric, is in brick on a chamfered stone plinth, with some stone dressings and a stone-slate roof. There are three bays, and the barn contains a re-set plaque, a segmental-headed wagon entrance, ventilation holes in diamond patterns, and a four-light mullioned window.	II
Barn, White Dial Farm; 53.66318°N 2.82642°W	—	18th century (probable)	A brick barn with a slate roof and three bays. It contains a segmental-headed wagon entrance, windows, and a circular pitching hole.	II
14 Gorse Lane; 53.67929°N 2.83271°W	—	1778	A brick cottage with stone dressings and a slate roof. It has two storeys and a symmetrical two-bay front. Above the central doorway is a large inscribed stone lintel. The windows are sliding sashes, those in the ground floor having large lintels.	II
Canal bridge 53.67590°N 2.81914°W	—	c. 1790 (probable)	This is bridge No. 11, and carries the A59 road over the Rufford Branch of the Leeds and Liverpool Canal. It is in sandstone, and consists of a single elliptical arch. The bridge has voussoirs, a band, a parapet with rounded coping, and pilastered ends.	II
Bank Bridge Warehouse; 53.67618°N 2.81923°W		c. 1790 (probable)	The warehouse is by the Rufford Branch of the Leeds and Liverpool Canal, and is in brick with sandstone dressings and a slate roof. It has three bays and three storeys. The building includes doorways, loading bays, and windows.	II
War memorial 53.67765°N 2.83220°W		c. 1920	The war memorial stands to the north of Holy Trinity Church, it is in limestone, and is about 4.1 metres (13 ft) high. The memorial consists of a fleur-de-lis cross with an oblong, chamfered, tapering shaft on an octagonal plinth with a three-stepped base. In the centre of the cross head is carved the Christogram "IHS". The plinth has a moulded cornice with corbels, and is carved with Gothic tracery and other designs. There are inscriptions on the base of the plinth, including the names of the major battles in the First World War, and a further inscription on the base.	II
