= Mere Brow =

Village in Lancashire, England

Coordinates: 53.661°N 2.882°W

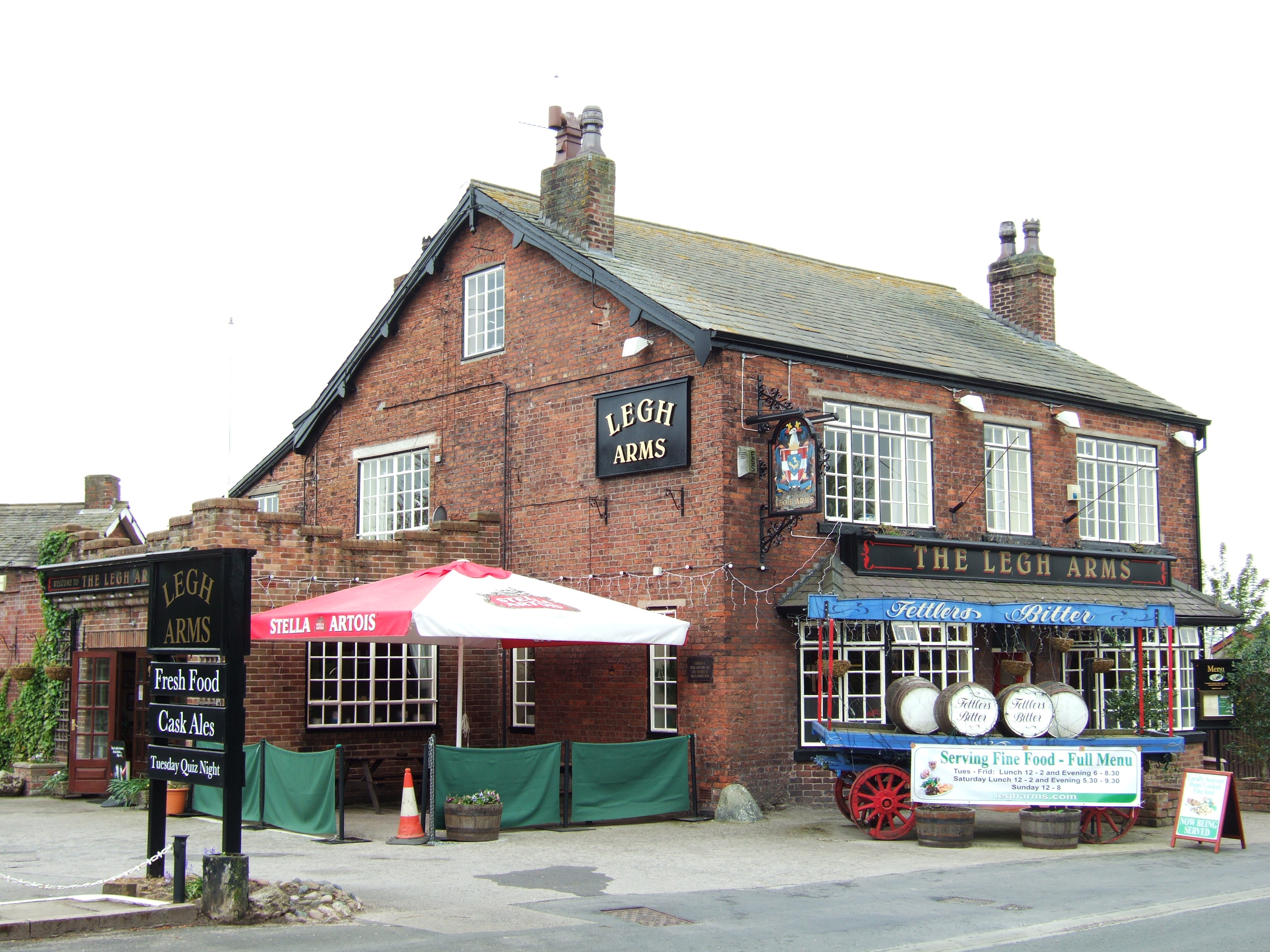
- Legh Arms public house

- Location in West Lancashire Location within Lancashire
- OS grid reference: SD417186
- Civil parish: Tarleton
- District: West Lancashire
- Shire county: Lancashire
- Region: North West
- Country: England
- Sovereign state: United Kingdom
- Post town: PRESTON
- Postcode district: PR4
- Dialling code: 01772
- Police: Lancashire
- Fire: Lancashire
- Ambulance: North West
- UK Parliament: South Ribble

Mere Brow is a small village in Lancashire, England, situated between Tarleton and Banks, just off the A565 road. It is 6 miles (9 km) east of Southport and 10 miles (15 km) south west of Preston. It is administered by the West Lancashire Borough Council and the Tarleton parish council. It is in the West Lancashire parliamentary constituency. Mere Brow is the second largest village in the parish of Tarleton, the largest being Tarleton and the smallest being Holmes and Sollom.

== History ==
Mere Brow and the neighbouring village of Holmes were part of the ancient parish of North Meols but now are part of Tarleton parish. The name Mere Brow is believed to have come from the time when it was the most northerly settlement on Martin Mere.

== Economy ==
Mere Brow was primarily an agricultural village due to the excellent soil, although there was fishing activity for many years. Production of flowers and vegetables is common on the farms around the village. The village has a public house, the 'Legh Arms', named from the owners of Bank Hall, a restaurant, cafe, smithy, a village hall, general store and animal feed merchants, "Ascroft's" and livery yard. At the leisure lakes there is a golf driving range and nine-hole course, caravan park, equestrian centre, paintballing, watersport and angling centre. The village had two petrol garages on the A565 road which closed, one re-opened in 2002 as a carwash. The post office closed in 2008 leaving the nearest alternative in Banks. However, this one also shut recently which means that the closest option is currently situated within a Spar convenience store in Tarleton (ironically slightly nearer). The bank closed in the mid 1990s and is now a residential dwelling.

== Public services ==
The local hospitals are Southport District General Hospital and Ormskirk District General Hospital, the nearest GP surgery is in Tarleton.

== Education ==
Mere Brow Church of England Primary School was founded in 1847 as a national school providing free education. The school and adjoining school house were built on land known as 'the Warth' granted to Reverend Master by George Anthony Legh Keck for the poorer people in Tarleton. The school is associated with Holy Trinity Church in Tarleton and has expanded to meet the increased demands. As of 2010 the school had 52 pupils. Secondary age pupils attend Tarleton High School or Bishop Rawstorne CE Academy.

== Religion ==
Mere Brow Methodist Church was opened in 1902. Before it was built, the tin roofed cottage next to it was used for worship. St Mary's Church, Tarleton was the nearest Church of England church until Holy Trinity was opened in 1888.

== Community ==
The village has held a giant pumpkin competition in October since 1994. There is a bowling club and youth club at the village hall.
