= North Meols =

- Civil parish
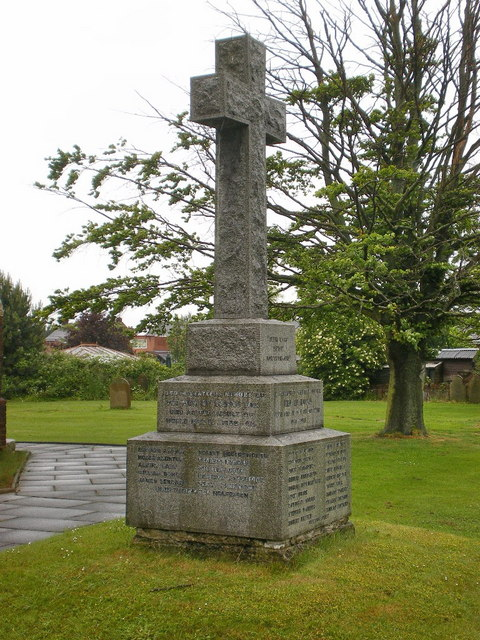
- War memorial

- Location in West Lancashire Location in Lancashire
- Coordinates: 53.682°N 2.925°W
- Country: England
- Primary council: West Lancashire
- County: Lancashire
- Region: North West England
- Status: Parish

Population (2011)
  - Total: 4,146
- Postal code: PR9

North Meols (/ˈmiːlz/) is a civil parish and electoral ward in the West Lancashire district of Lancashire, England. The parish covers the village of Banks and the hamlet of Hundred End. The population of the parish/ward at the 2011 census was 4,146. Historically the parish covered a wider area including much of what is now Southport.

== Demography ==
According to the 2001 census the population of North Meols was 3,793, and 3,730 of those people were white. Only 60 people in the village were from other ethnicity.

By the 2011 census the population had risen to 4,146.

Population growth in North Meols from 1901–1961
Year	1901	1911	1921	1931	1941	1961
Population	1,825	1,830	1,908	2,197	2,634	2,700
North Meols CP/AP

== Ancient parish ==
The civil parish is based on an ancient parish located to the north and east of the town of Southport, which straddled what is now the border between the counties of Merseyside and Lancashire. North Meols included Crossens, Marshside and Churchtown in the north of Southport, and then extended east towards Preston to encompass the rural villages of Banks, Far Banks and Hundred End, Mere Brow and Holmes in West Lancashire. It was bounded to the south by the Martin Mere wetland.

=== History ===
Dating from before the Norman conquest, this area of small farming and fishing villages was originally known as Otegrimeles, from the Norse word "melr", meaning sand-dunes. The present pronunciation "mee-als" stems from Old Norse influences on the local dialect. This is also found in other dialects with strong Norse connections, especially the dialect of Shetland. Compare, however with Meols pronounced as "mells", on the nearby Wirral.

Historically, North Meols has been centred on St. Cuthbert's Church in Churchtown, although there were vicarages in Crossens, Banks and Birkdale. Parts of the parish were almost completely surrounded by water until large scale drainage of Martin Mere and other marshland in the 19th century. This left behind a legacy of fine agricultural soil, which is still exploited to this day – the primary industry in the area is farming, especially of flowers and vegetables.

To this day, the northern part of the district retains a lot of its rural character, with the only large-scale development being the construction of a large number of new homes in Banks. The southern districts, although now fully incorporated into Southport have also not been fully urbanised; Churchtown retains its attractive centre and extensive botanic gardens, and the marshes to the west of Crossens and Marshside have been preserved for their wildlife.

== Transport ==
North Meols was previously home to the West Lancashire Railway, fully opened in 1878, which ran between Southport and Preston. Low passenger numbers later led to its decline and its closure was assured by the Beeching Axe in 1964.

The main transport link through the area is now the A565 road Southport New Road, which runs from Southport north-east to Preston.

== Community ==
North Meols is administered for public services by both Sefton Borough Council and West Lancashire District Council. For more local matters, there is also the North Southport Area Committee and the North Meols Parish Council.

The main community centre for the district is the Banks Leisure Centre, located just off Southport New Road in Banks.

== Listed buildings ==
There was one listed buildings in the parish, Greaves Hall. This was built in 1900 as a country house, and was used later as a hospital. It was in Tudor Revival style, and was a timber-framed building with rendered infill on a brick plinth. It had tiled roofs and many gables. The building was listed at Grade II, the lowest of the three grades of listing, which is applied to buildings that are "of special interest, warranting every effort to preserve them". However the condition of the building deteriorated and because it was considered to be dangerous, it was demolished in 2009.

In October 2016 Banks War Memorial was listed at Grade II. The memorial stands in the churchyard of St Stephen in the Banks, it is granite, and consists of a Latin cross with a square shaft, standing on a three-stepped inscribed plinth.
