= Holmes, Lancashire =

Hamlet in Lancashire, England

Coordinates: 53.668°N 2.858°W

Holmes
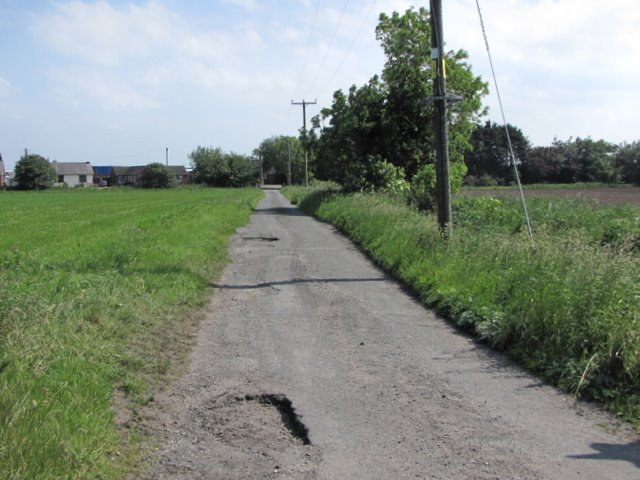
- Hunters Lane

- Location in West Lancashire Location within Lancashire
- Population: 5,350 2001 Census (Tarleton Parish)
- OS grid reference: SD433194
- Civil parish: Tarleton
- District: West Lancashire
- Shire county: Lancashire
- Region: North West
- Country: England
- Sovereign state: United Kingdom
- Post town: PRESTON
- Postcode district: PR4
- Dialling code: 01772
- Police: Lancashire
- Fire: Lancashire
- Ambulance: North West
- UK Parliament: South Ribble

Holmes is a hamlet in West Lancashire, England. It is adjacent to the larger village of Mere Brow, which is between the much larger villages of Banks to the west and Tarleton to the east. It is directly situated on the A565 road, which gives the village good links with Preston, Southport and Liverpool. Historically, the village was an agricultural settlement, due to the excellent soil, and farming is still important.

The hamlet is administered by West Lancashire District Council and Tarleton parish council. Holmes and neighbouring Mere Brow were part of the ancient parish of North Meols but now are part of Tarleton parish.

Holmes has a small church. The main business is Huntapac, a farming company that grows and supplies vegetables to supermarkets.
