= Banks, Lancashire =

Village in Lancashire, England

Coordinates: 53.683°N 2.917°W

Banks
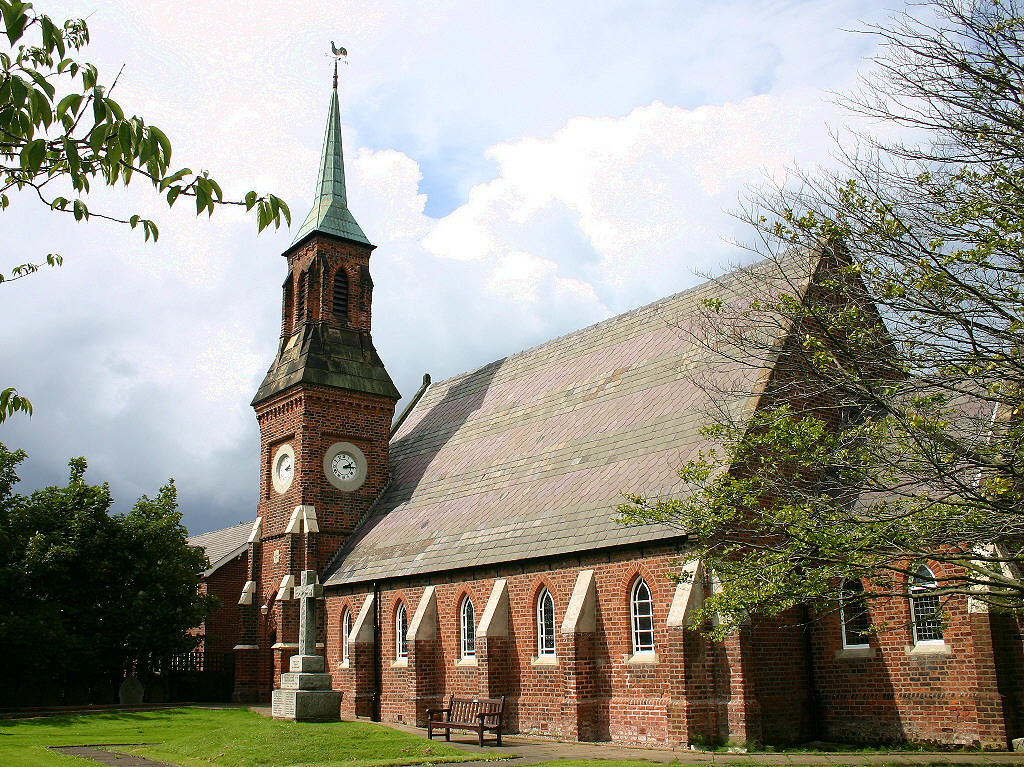
- St Stephen's Church

- Location in West Lancashire Location within Lancashire
- Population: 4,430 (2021 census)
- OS grid reference: SD395212
- Civil parish: North Meols
- District: West Lancashire
- Shire county: Lancashire
- Region: North West
- Country: England
- Sovereign state: United Kingdom
- Post town: SOUTHPORT
- Postcode district: PR9
- Dialling code: 01704
- Police: Lancashire
- Fire: Lancashire
- Ambulance: North West
- UK Parliament: Southport

Banks /ˈbæŋks/ is a coastal village in the civil parish of North Meols, in the West Lancashire district, in Lancashire, England, south of the Ribble estuary four miles (6 km) north-east of Southport town centre. In 2021 it had a population of 4430. It is in the Southport parliamentary constituency.

Banks is the largest village in the parish of North Meols on the West Lancashire coastal plain. It was primarily an agricultural community due to the excellent soil, although there was fishing activity for many years. Production of flowers and vegetables is common on the farms surrounding the village. The proximity of Southport and Preston have led to its expansion as a dormitory for commuters.

== History ==
=== Toponymy ===
Banks is believed to have been named for the many artificial embankments built in the north of the village to protect it from winter floods from the River Ribble and the tide. The old embankments can be seen when entering Banks at Marsh Road and at the end of George's Lane. However, these embankments became redundant when the River Ribble retreated in the 1900s and larger ones are in place further north creating more farmland.

=== Early history ===
The earliest recorded history commences with a deed concerning Far Banks, made in the reign of Henry II in 1154. It relates to a Guide House for travellers who forded the River Ribble from the Fylde to North Meols. At this time the area was on the most northern fringe of the ancient division of West Derby and the local area was called meles, meaning sand dunes.

The area was isolated to the north and west by the Ribble estuary, to the south by a chain of barren sand hills, to the east by a lake called Martin Mere – which at the time was the largest lake in England covering 3,132 acres (12.67 km^{2}).

The biggest coastal disaster in the area was in 1719 when 5,000 acres of the Ribble estuary, from Crossens to Hesketh Bank and Tarleton were flooded, when the sea banks broke. A total of 47 houses were carried away by the tidal flood. Nine people drowned and cattle, sheep and crops were lost.

=== North Meols ===
Dating from before the Norman Conquest of 1066, this area of small farming and fishing villages was originally known as Otegrimeles, from the Norse word melr, meaning sand dunes. Historically, North Meols centred on St. Cuthbert's Church in Churchtown, although there were vicarages in Crossens, Banks and Birkdale. Parts of the parish were almost completely surrounded by water until the drainage of Martin Mere and other marshland was completed. This was done by the irrigation and sluice ditches constructed by Thomas Fleetwood of Bank Hall in 1692, with further attempts in 1780. The drainage was completed in the 19th century with the construction of Crossens pumping station. This left a legacy of fine agricultural soil, which continues to be exploited – the primary industry in the area is farming, especially of flowers and vegetables.

=== Banks railway station ===
Banks had a station on the West Lancashire Railway which opened on 19 February 1878, on the line between Southport and Preston railway station to carry passengers and produce to be sold at town markets. The station had a depot and goods yard for coal merchants. The line crossed Hoole Lane, Long Lane and Square House Lane where there were staffed level crossings. Low passenger numbers led to the railway's decline and its closure was assured by the Beeching Axe on 7 September 1964. The stone bridge supports that carried the track across the sluice ditches in Banks can still be seen and the station platform still exists. The route is used as a public footpath.

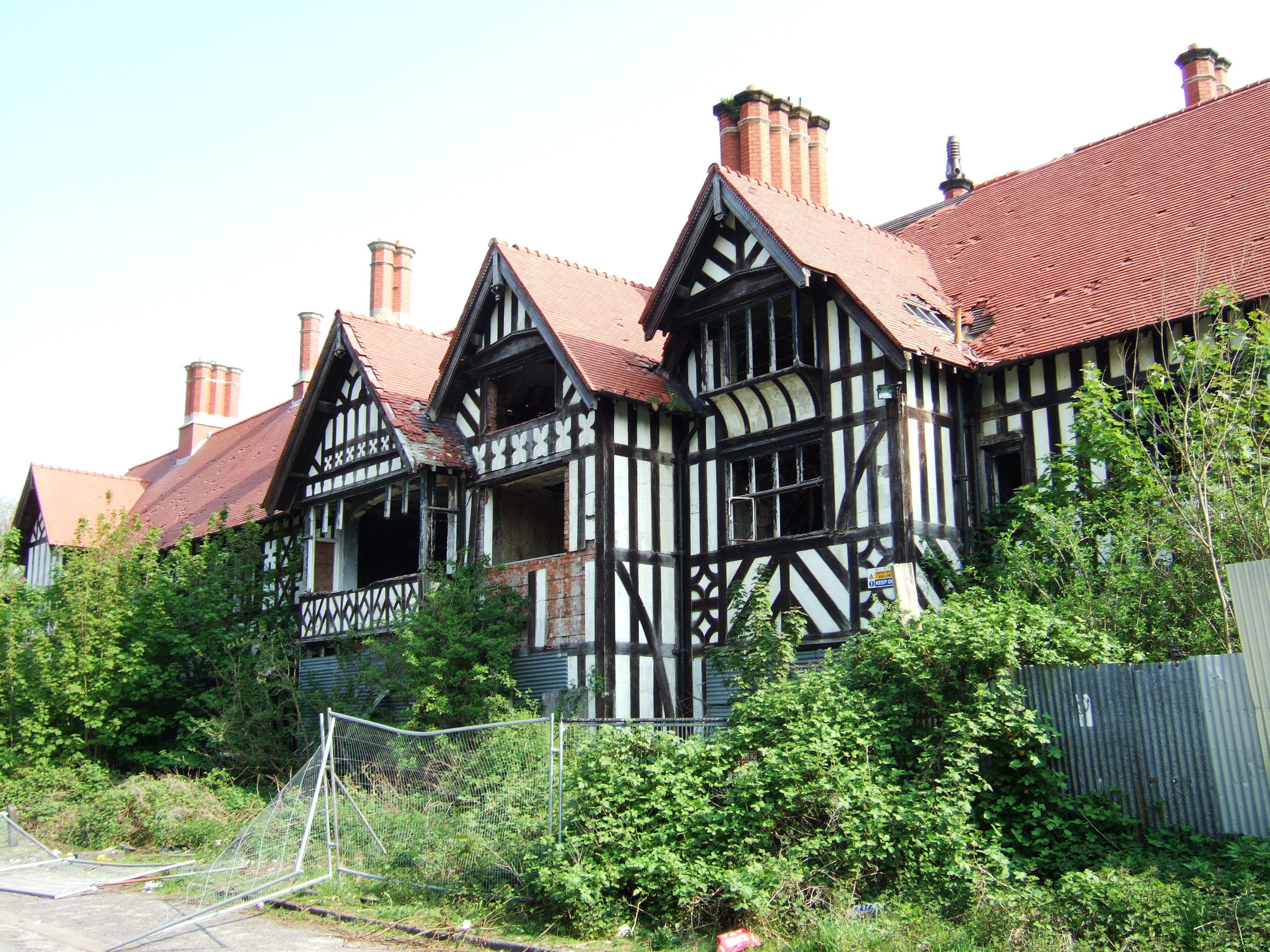
Greaves Hall before it was demolished

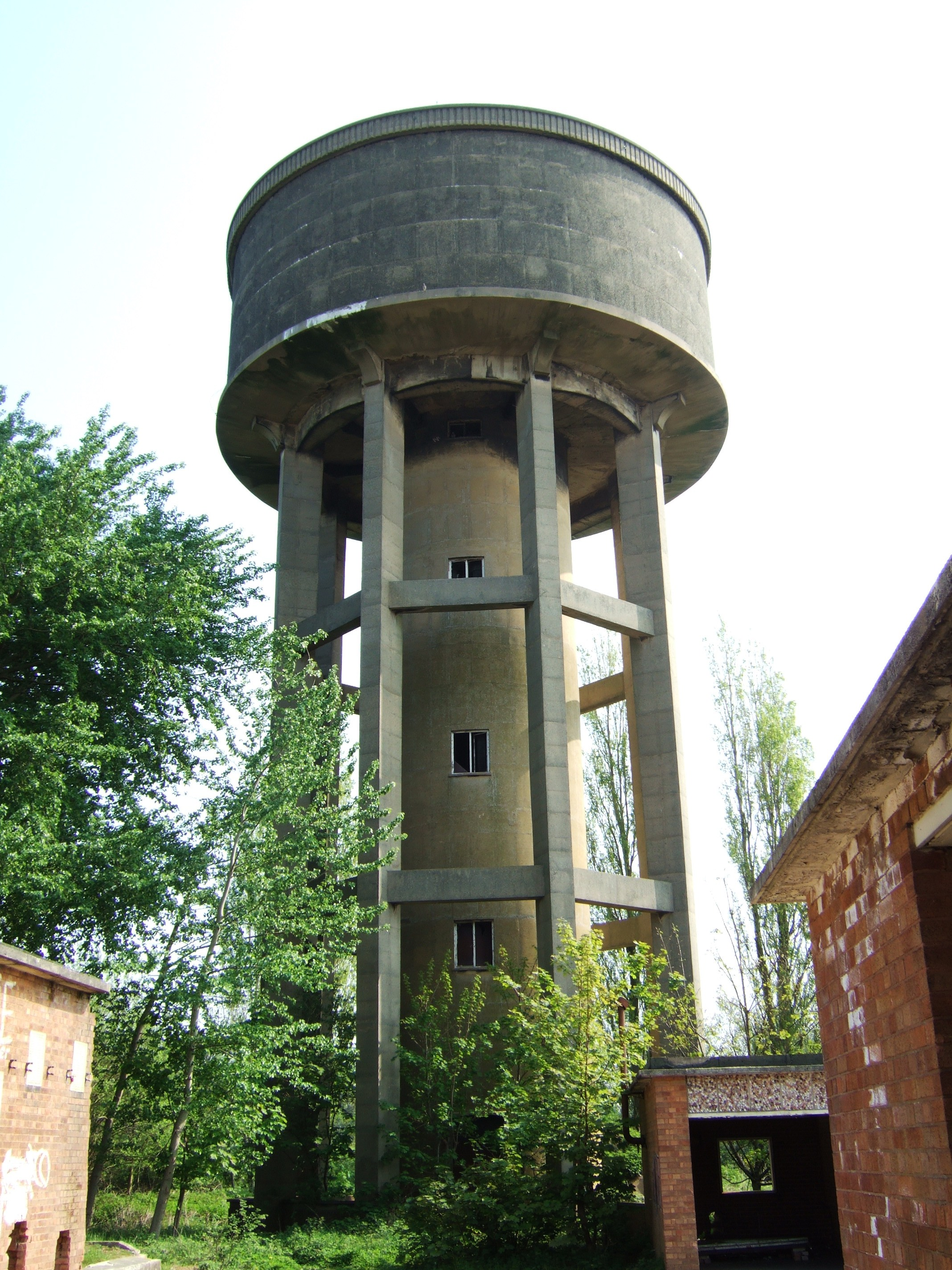
Water Tower off Aveling Drive

=== Greaves Hall ===
Thomas Talbot Leyland Scarisbrick was born in 1874. He grew up in Southport and was educated in Lancashire. In 1900 he built Greaves Hall on a 124-acre (0.50 km^{2}) site. It had a porter's lodge by the main entrance, a gardener's lodge, engineer's workshop, laundry and general workshop, all built close to the hall in a mock Tudor style. The mansion was surrounded by lawns and gardens filled with ornamental trees and flowering shrubs. The hall had approximately 55 rooms, open areas situated on the ground, first, second and attic floors and a vast basement.

The Scarisbrick family lived at Greaves Hall until after the First World War when they moved to Scarisbrick Hall and sold the estate to a consortium of Banks farmers. The mansion stood empty while the land was cultivated by the consortium. The mansion and grounds were occupied by Sherbrook School for Girls. The school was closed when the Health Authority took over the hall as a TB hospital and subsequently for patients with mental health and learning disabilities from Liverpool during and after the Second World War. Greaves Hall Hospital had wards built in the grounds and the mansion house was used for administration. In the early 1990s the facility was moved to Southport.

Given Grade II listed status in 1997, Greaves Hall suffered many fires and vandalism. Its owners claimed it was beyond repair and two planning applications to demolish it were refused. On 4 August 2009 a small section of the roof collapsed, within days it was cleared and full demolition commenced on 13 August. The site of the Greaves Hall mansion house and former hospital maintenance area has been redeveloped for housing.

=== Water tower ===
The water tower off Aveling Drive dominated the skyline from the 1960s. It could be seen from miles around and from Winter Hill, 20 miles (32 km) east from the village. The tower was built for Greaves Hall Hospital and was decommissioned in 1992 when the hospital closed. After a failed preservation attempt, it was demolished in 2018 under protest by local residents.

== Geography ==
Banks is in North West England. The closest cities are Preston approximately 12 miles (19 km) to the north east and Liverpool approximately 18 miles (29 km) to the south west. The nearest town is Southport, 4 miles (6 km) southwest of the village.

Situated on the west Lancashire coastal plain, most of the village is only slightly above sea level and parts can be susceptible to flooding. There are embankments to the north of the village and there are drainage systems across the area, most notably the pumping station on Banks Road, Crossens.

The drainage of Martin Mere in the mid-19th century created a legacy of fine agricultural soil. The primary industry in the area is farming, especially of flowers and vegetables.

The area has a maritime climate like most of the UK. It rarely sees substantial snowfall and temperatures rarely fall below −5 °C (23 °F) so it does not have frequent frosts. Banks generally has moderate precipitation, unlike the rest of western UK.

=== Areas ===
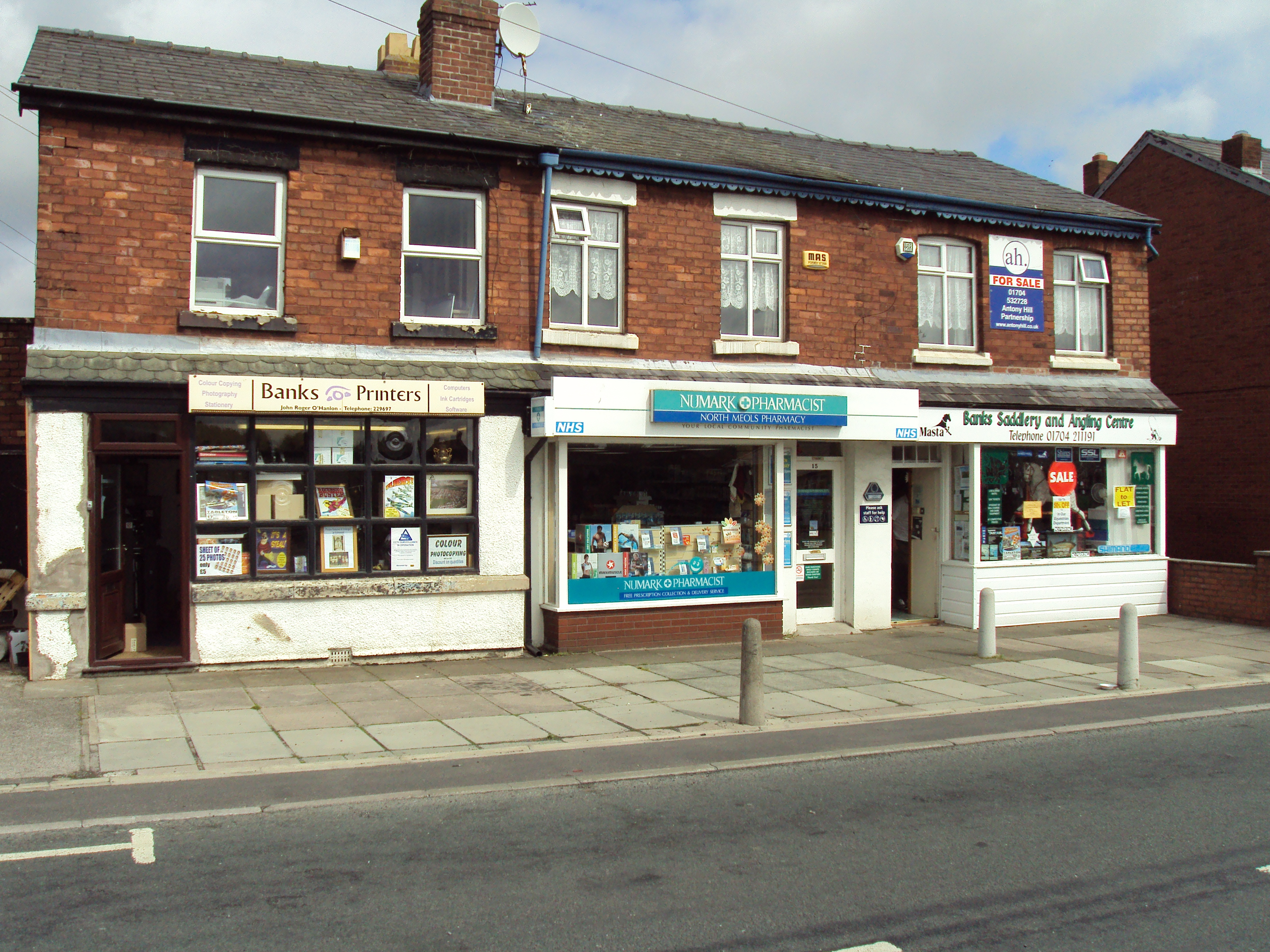
Shops on Church Road

Banks Village is the central part of Banks and where most of the shops, both the religious sites and the primary schools are situated. It is also where Greaves Hall was situated. Far Banks is the east side of the village from Smithy Corner to the border with Hundred End and Tarleton. Banks Enclosed Marsh is former marshland in the north which has been reclaimed for agriculture. This area is sparsely populated, consisting mostly of farmhouses. Banks Marsh is the far north of the village and is part of the Ribble estuary. There are no houses in this area as it prone to flooding.

There are three other areas in the civil parish of North Meols: Hundred End is a hamlet on Marsh Road between Banks and Hesketh Bank, Churchtown/Crossens Moss is south west of the village and mostly used for agriculture. The villages of Churchtown and Crossens are part of Southport.

=== Banks Marsh ===
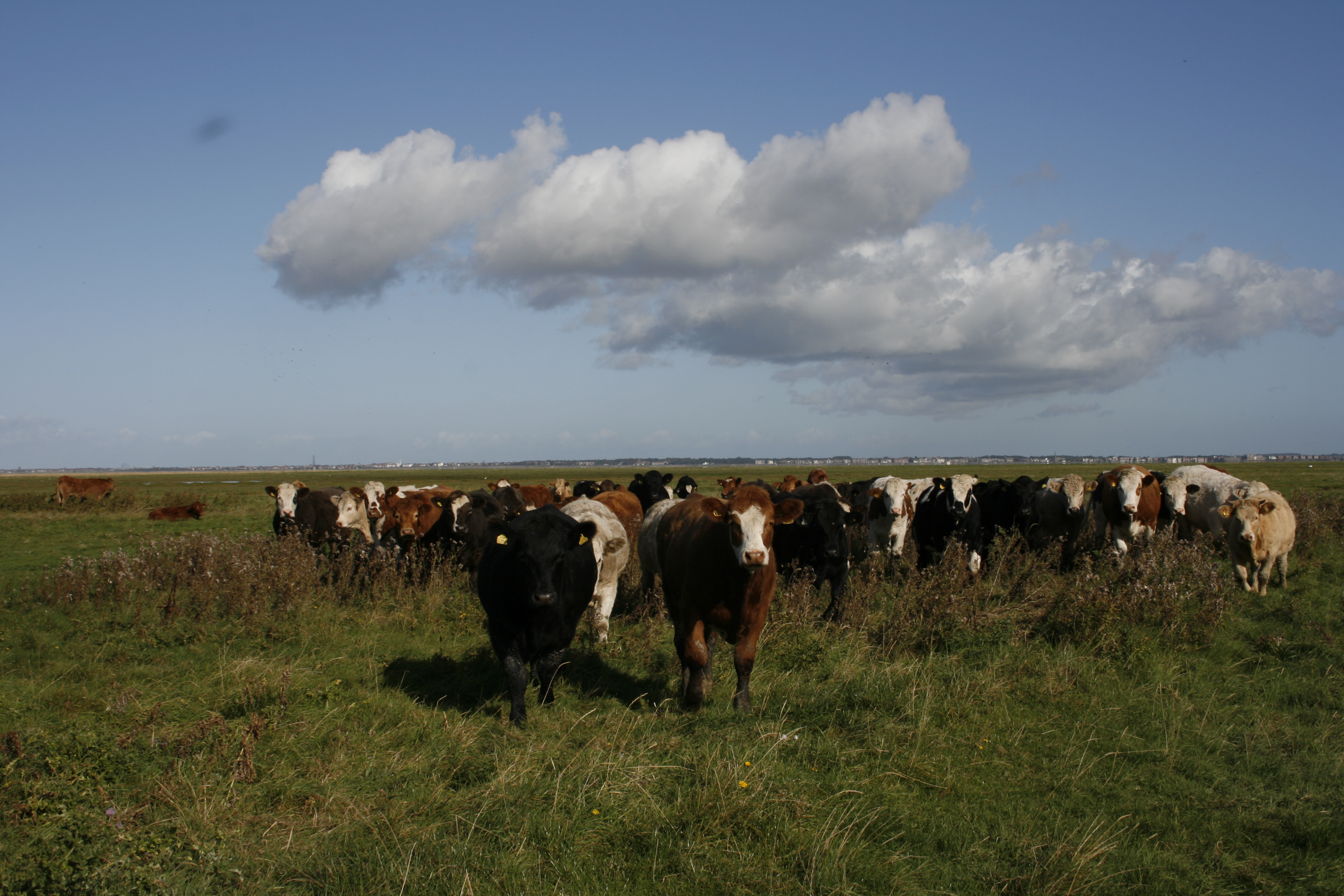
Cattle grazing on the salt marshes of the Ribble Estuary

Banks Marsh forms the largest area of marshland within the Ribble Estuary National Nature Reserve. It is one of the most important sites in the United Kingdom for wintering wildfowl. The reserve, established in 1979, occupies over half of the total area of the Ribble Estuary, including extensive areas of mud and sand flats and almost all of the salt marsh habitat - one of the largest such areas in England. Its 4,697 hectares (11,610 acres) contain large areas of intertidal mud and sand flats.

The reserve has been declared a Ramsar site and a Special Protection Area (SPA). In summer the salt marsh supports large numbers of breeding birds including black-headed gull, European herring gull, lesser black-backed gull, common tern and common redshank. Skylark, meadow pipit and linnet nest in significant numbers on the grazing marsh. Management of the site involves grazing the salt marsh with cattle to maintain the short sward on which wintering wildfowl (especially Eurasian wigeon and the pink-footed goose) depend. The main area of salt marsh is grazed by approximately 800 cattle from May to October, forming one of the largest single herds of cattle in the UK. Wildfowling takes place on much of the reserve and improved management has contributed to the increase in the number of birds visiting the site. A group of volunteers led by the local Wildfowlers Association carries out much of the valuable maintenance work on the reserve.

The Ribble Estuary is an important part of the network of wetland sites in Western Europe. It supports over a quarter of a million waders and wildfowl each winter, and is an internationally important site for twenty species of birds. Recreation, fishing, wildfowling and farming all take place within the estuary in balance with the wildlife interest.

== Governance ==
Banks is part of the Southport parliamentary constituency and is represented by the Labour Member of Parliament Patrick Hurley.

At local government level, Banks is one of the two remaining settlements within the historical civil parish of North Meols and has its own parish council. North Meols is also a ward under the administration of West Lancashire Borough Council.

== Economy ==
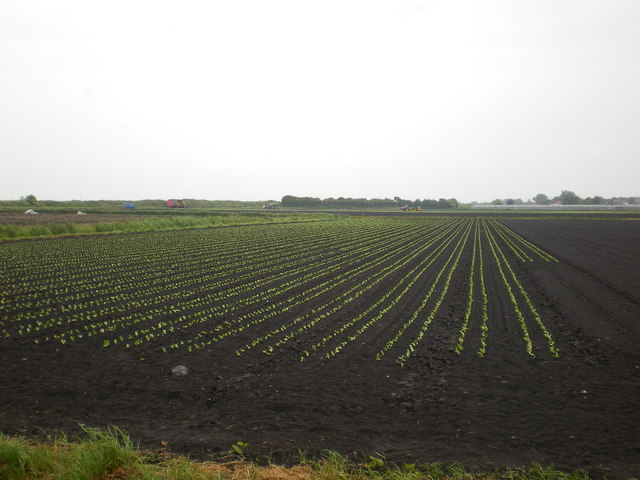
Example of arable farming in Banks

Even though modern Banks is primarily a commuter village for Southport, Liverpool and Preston, there is farming activity which has been the core of the community for hundreds of years. Most of the produce grown on the farms was sold to local markets, but now most is either sold to national supermarkets or to countries in the EU.

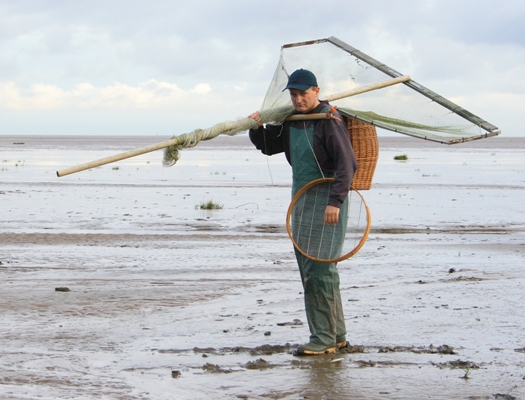
One of the few traditional shrimpers from Banks

Banks once had a thriving shrimping industry but this has dwindled to almost nothing due to cheaper foreign competition. Recently there has been interest on Banks Marsh in the edible seaweed, samphire, (locally known as Sampi). It is found on few coastal areas in Europe. It is picked by local people in the summer months and mostly sold to Booths supermarkets that sell local produce.

There are two business areas made up of small businesses that provide local services. One is on the A565 (Southport New Road) and the other is a Granite worktop manufacturing business (Granite House) in the former grounds of Greaves Hall. Banks has a post office. There is Co-op store, a hairdressers, and a newsagents. Healthcare facilities include the North Meols Medical Centre on Church Road, a doctor's surgery and a pharmacy. A new care home was completed in August 2014 (located just off Guinea Hall Lane on Greaves Hall Lane). Shortly afterwards a learning and head injury home was built adjacent to the care home. There is also a community centre on Hoole Lane.

The village attracts walkers to its many public footpaths, and Banks Marsh attracts bird watchers. In addition many cyclists pass through the village and in recent years The Tour of Britain has passed through Banks on the A565.

== Transport ==
Since the closure of Banks railway station in 1964, the nearest railway station is Southport, 4 miles (6 km) south west of the village, with trains to Liverpool, Wigan, Bolton and Manchester.

The village has regular bus services linking it with Southport, Formby, Crosby, Bootle, Liverpool and Preston.

=== Roads ===
Ralph's Wife's Lane is the main road connecting Banks with Crossens to the south. Its name is suggested to originate from a Ralph who was a fisherman or a smuggler, and was lost at sea.

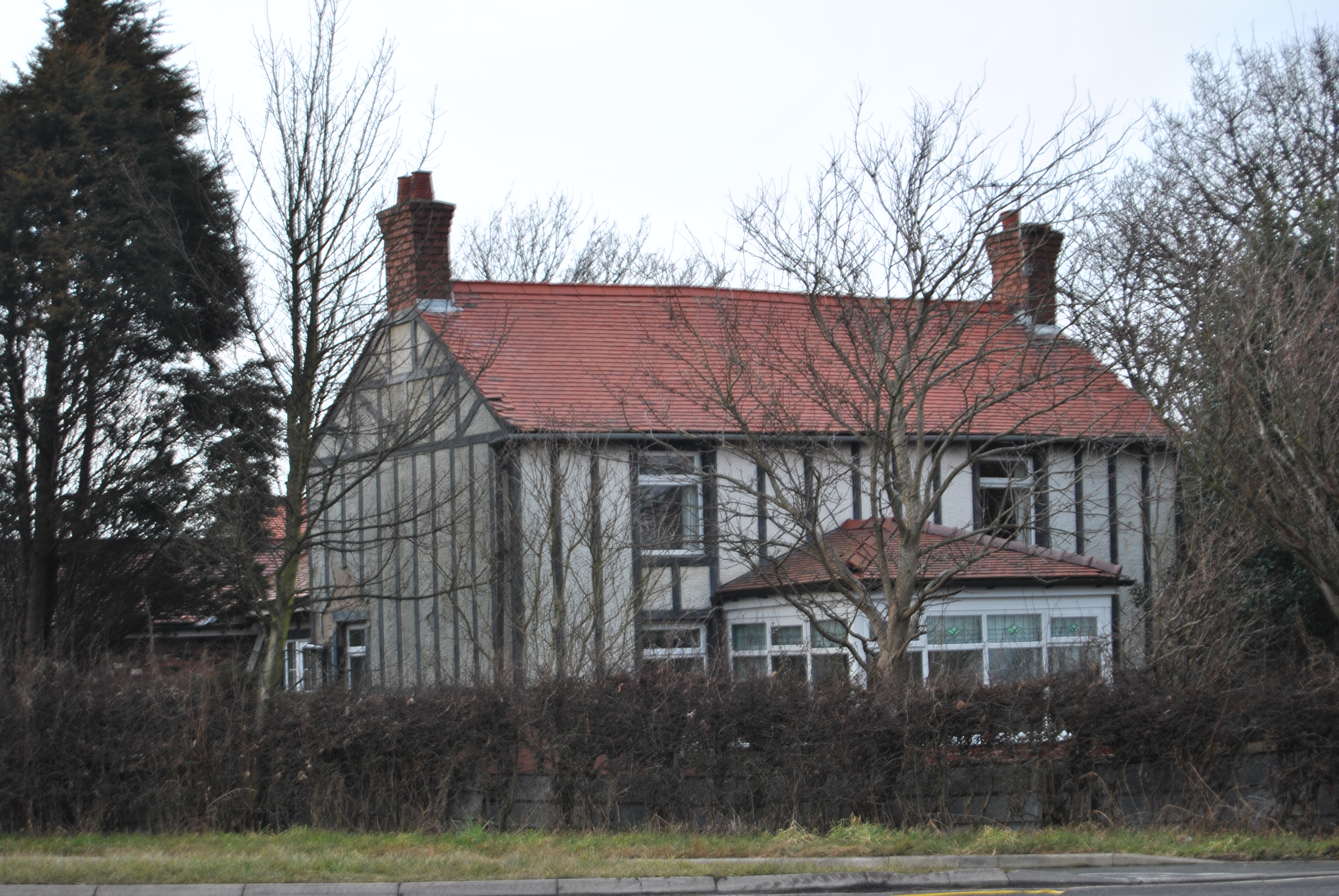
Greaves Hall Lodge at Sugar Stubbs Lane

Sugar Stubbs Lane is situated in Far Banks down the A565 road towards Mere Brow. The road was once a track across the marsh. In the 1980s the road was extended across the Banks Moss towards Hundred End and Tarleton. Its history is that it was the route taken by monks from Lancaster who travelled by boat across the marsh to Liverpool, and marked their way across the marsh and estuary by dropping the stubbs from the sugar canes along the way so they could find their way back giving the name to Sugar Stubbs Lane and Sugar Stubbs Farm where a small farm shop is run from the house.

There are four properties on the lane, one, the former Mock Tudor gatehouse to Greaves Hall at the junction of the A565 road and Sugar Stubbs Lane. The driveway to Greaves Hall was restored in 2005 and is a public footpath.

== Education ==
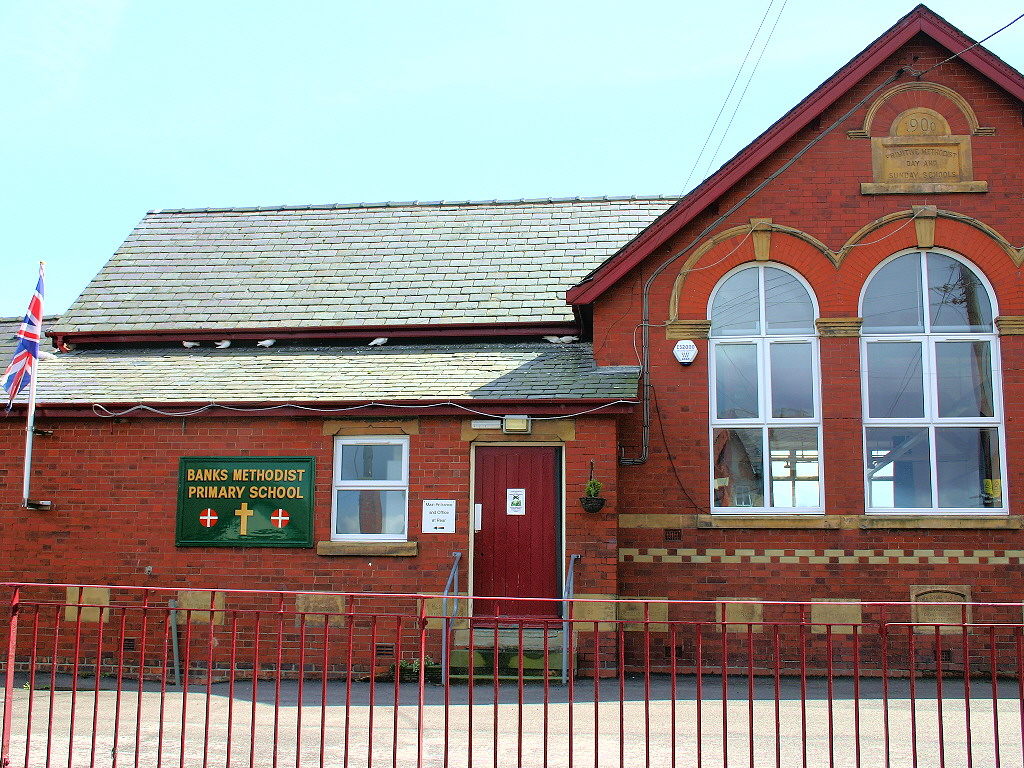
Banks Methodist Primary School

The village has two primary schools, Banks Methodist Primary School on Chapel Lane and Banks St Stephens Primary School on Greaves Hall Avenue. (Banks St Stephens school relocated to its present site from Hoole Lane in July 1998.) There is also a children's nursery on Station Road. There are no secondary schools in Banks and most children aged 11–16 attend Tarleton High School or secondary schools in Southport.

== Religious sites ==
The village has two notable places of worship: Banks Methodist Chapel situated on Chapel Lane and St Stephens Church in the centre of the village on Church Road.

== Leisure ==
Banks Leisure Centre on Greaves Hall Avenue was known as North Meols Leisure Centre. It has two 7-a-side all weather football pitches, a sports hall and a fitness suite.

The Riverside Holiday Park is on Southport New Road. The site is operated by Harrison Leisure, who have a large caravan showroom complex which now dominates the site. There is a small cafe in the building previously used as the gym, the pool building remains, but only used by guests. The former nightclub was demolished in 2017 to make way for a retail development.

== Culture ==
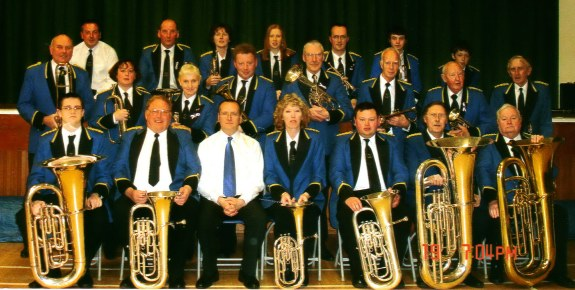
Banks Brass Band

Banks brass band was formed in 1875. It plays at various functions and takes part in the annual village street parade.

Once a year (usually in late October) Banks Methodist Primary School holds a scarecrow competition to celebrate Halloween. It was started in 2007 and it involves people (mainly children) making scarecrows in their gardens for a week before the judging begins at the school.

The Women's Institutes holds meetings in the small hall on Meols Court. The hall is used for other recreational purposes, such as bingo for the senior citizens.

=== Outdoor life ===
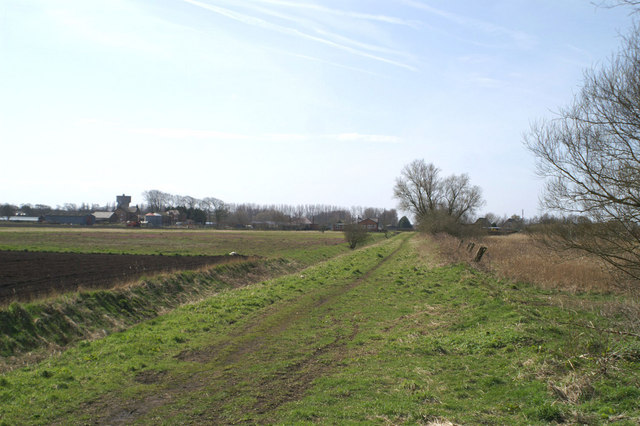
Old railway line now used as a public footpath that stretches across the whole village

The marshland which lies on the coast of the Ribble estuary is highly regarded for bird watching and attracts many visitors. It is a site of special scientific interest.

There are footpaths across the village including the old railway line from Southport New Road to Rydings Lane in Far Banks. It is owned by the Environment Agency and is open to the public, dog walkers and horse riders. Hoole Lane is the starting point of a 10-mile cycle route that extends down the coast through Southport to Ainsdale.

The Sluice, sometimes called the River Crossens and the Back Drain flow through Banks and are popular with anglers.

There are two recreational grounds in Banks, one of which is mostly used for cricket. The other was once part of the Greaves Hall grounds and is now used by the football team. There are three children's play areas.

== Media ==
Most residents get two weekly free newspapers, the Southport Midweek Visiter and the independent Southport Champion. The village shops sells the Southport Visiter on Fridays. The Ormskirk and West Lancashire Advertiser is sold in the area.

Banks received the local radio station called Dune FM closed down in 2012, which was based in Southport. Other radio stations based elsewhere in the region are popular such as Hits Radio Lancashire. Because the village is on the border of Merseyside and in Lancashire, the village picks up signals from both BBC Radio Merseyside and BBC Radio Lancashire.

== Growth ==
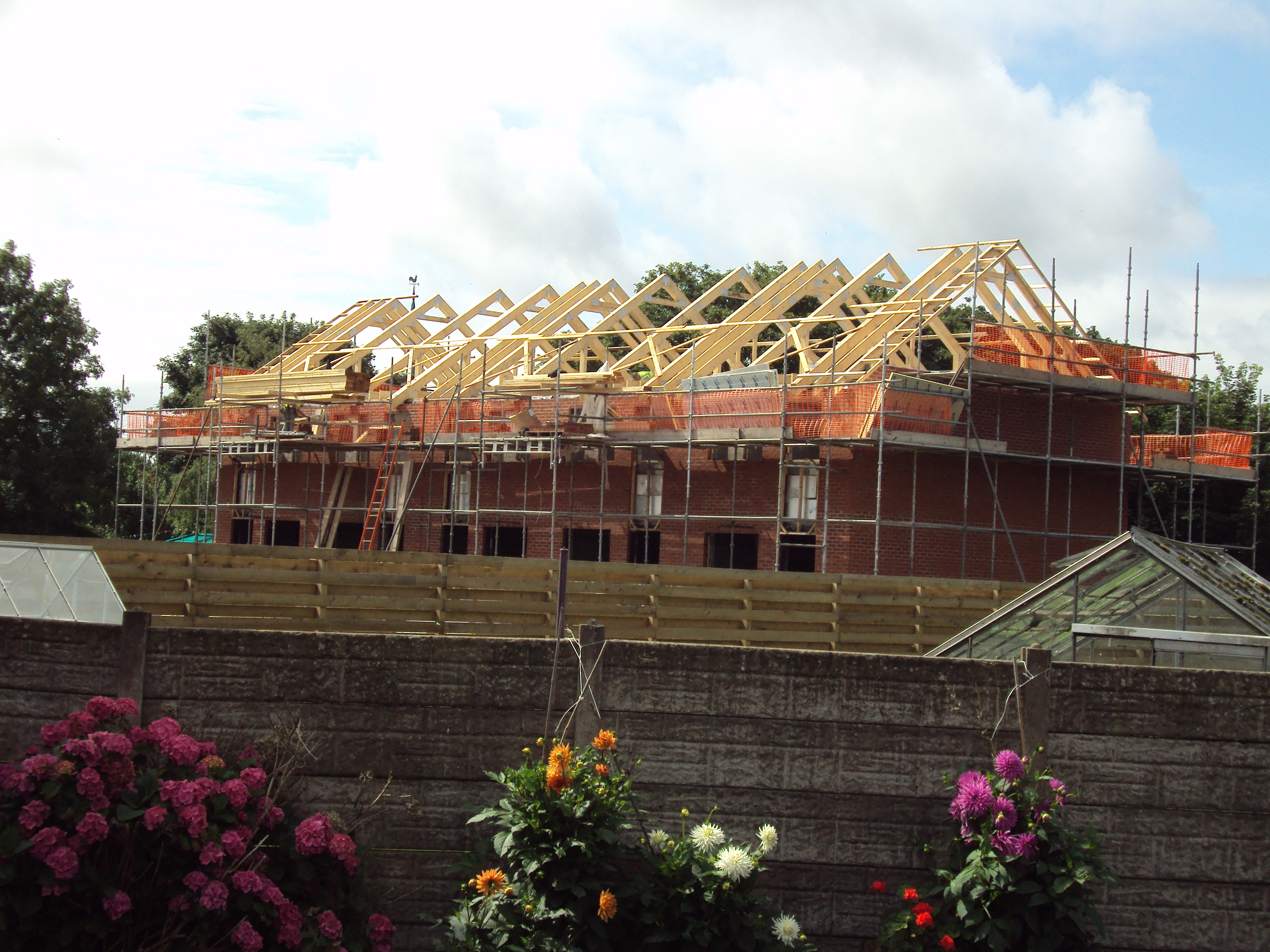
A building under construction in Banks

Banks has significantly increased its size and population. More housing and facilities have been constructed, particularly the housing estate on the former grounds of Greaves Hall by Seddon Homes. Since it was demolished in August 2009 there are plans to use the site for further residential development. Elsewhere in the village, new homes by the Redrow group were built in 2014 on Guinea Hall Lane and also a small estate opposite Aveling Drive (formerly a horse paddock). A care home, Sutton Grange completed in late summer 2014, as well as a brain injury and learning facility were constructed off Greaves Hall Lane completed shortly later as well as some shared ownership properties and rental properties by the Local Council opposite the Care Home. In 2016 further housing was built on Hoole Lane.

The area floods during long, heavy spells of rain, due to extra surface water from poor drainage. The local council has addressed this problem and works closely with developers.
