= Tarleton =

Village in Lancashire, England

Coordinates: 53.678°N 2.841°W

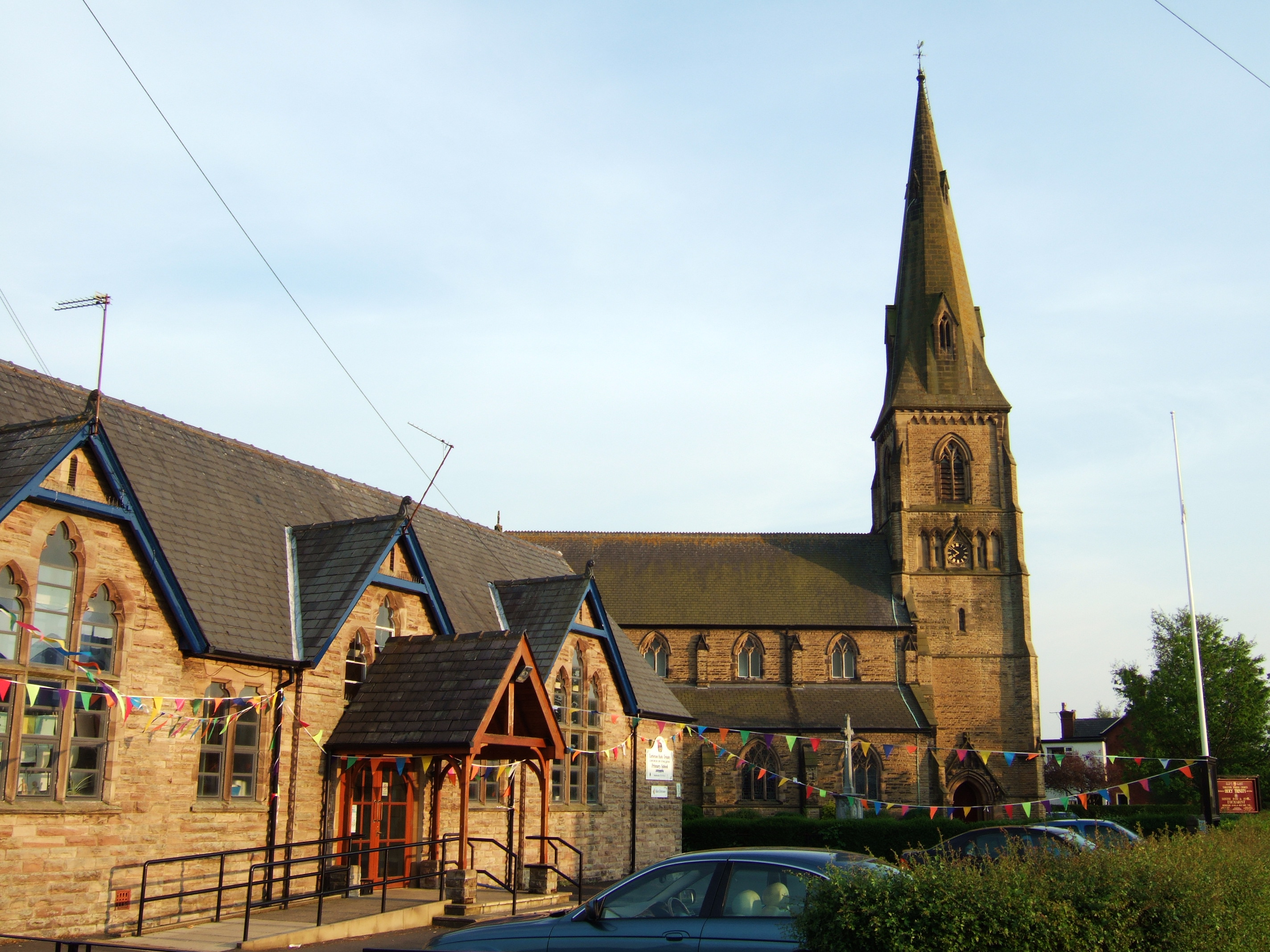
- Tarleton Parish Church and Holy Trinity Primary School

- Shown within West Lancashire Location within Lancashire
- Population: 5,959 (2021, parish)
- OS grid reference: SD445205
- Civil parish: Tarleton
- District: West Lancashire
- Shire county: Lancashire
- Region: North West
- Country: England
- Sovereign state: United Kingdom
- Post town: PRESTON
- Postcode district: PR4
- Dialling code: 01772
- Police: Lancashire
- Fire: Lancashire
- Ambulance: North West
- UK Parliament: Southport

Tarleton is a village and civil parish in the West Lancashire district of Lancashire, England. It is situated approximately 22 miles (35 km) north-east of Liverpool and 9 miles (14 km) south-west of Preston. The parish includes the village of Mere Brow and the hamlets of Sollom and Holmes, and is an agricultural area. It had a population of 5,959 at the 2021 Census. Tarleton village, Holmes, and the villages of Hesketh Bank and Becconsall to the north form a single built-up area with a population of 8,755.

== History ==
Tarleton is derived from the Old Norse Tharaldr, a personal name and the Old English tun, a farmstead or enclosure. The township was recorded as Tharilton in 1246 and subsequently Tarleton. Tarleton is mentioned in the Feet of Fines in 1298.

A local family with the Tarleton name either was named or gave its name to the early settlement by the reign of Richard II. The manor of Tarleton was part of the Montbegon or Hornby fee and divided into two moieties: two ploughlands were granted to John Malherbe and the remainder to the Banastres of Bretherton. In 1298 John Banastre of Bank held eight oxgangs of land in Tarleton. The Banastres held land in Tarleton of the Montbegons in 1526. This moiety of the manor passed to the Lilfords. The other moiety was granted to Roger de Douay, and then to Gilbert de Notton who gave Cockersand Abbey one ploughland. This portion, Holmeswood, was eventually acquired by the Heskeths of Rufford and sold to the Lilfords around 1886, uniting both portions.

In the 19th century a labourer discovered a small leaden box without a lid containing about a hundred silver coins whilst digging in a copse. They were possibly from the 17th century.

== Governance ==
Tarleton was a chapelry in the parish of Croston and subsequently a parish in the Leyland hundred. In 1837 it joined the Ormskirk Poor Law Union.

Tarleton is a civil parish in the South Ribble ward of West Lancashire Borough Council and has a parish council. It is currently within the Parliamentary Constituency of South Ribble.

The Parish of Tarleton is divided into three administrative wards, Central (which includes Sollom), Hesketh Lane and Mere Brow (which includes Holmes).

== Landmarks ==
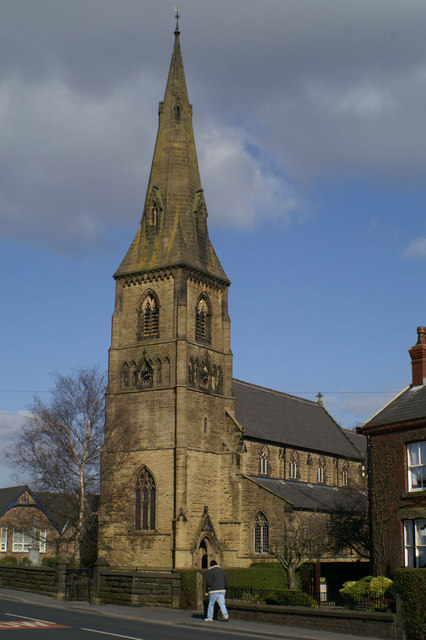
Holy Trinity Church on Church Road

The village has 18 listed buildings including barns, houses, farmhouses and St Mary's Church, which are of historical and architectural merit. The stone built 'Bank Bridge' (named after 'The Bank' which is the land that Bank Hall stands on), is Grade II listed and carries the A59 road over the Leeds and Liverpool Canal and River Douglas. Holmeswood Hall, dated 1568, was built as a hunting or fishing lodge by the Heskeths of Rufford, and is a grade II listed farmhouse.

== Education ==
Tarleton Community Primary School and Tarleton Holy Trinity Church of England Primary School serve the village. Tarleton Academy, a Technology College, serves the surrounding villages. It has a swimming pool and sports grounds. The high school is the home to Air Training Corps, 471 (Hesketh Bank and Tarleton) Squadron and a variety of sports clubs including cricket, football, rugby union and badminton clubs.

== Religion ==
There was an ancient chapel dedicated to St Helen in the township. George Dandy, the priest, founded a chantry there in about 1525. A hermitage in the chapel yard was occupied by Hugh Dobson, a hermit of the Order of St Anthony, in about 1530. Sir Thomas Hesketh bought and demolished the chapel, leaving Tarleton without a place of worship. In 1650 the inhabitants of Tarleton, Holmes and Sollom built a Presbyterian church at Three Lanes End which was assigned a parish in 1658. It was little used and fell into ruin.

In 1719 land was given, by Henrietta Maria Legh, of Bank Hall, for a new church close where the main road crosses the river. St. Mary's was the place of worship for the village until 1886. It is used for services once a year on "Old Church Sunday", the last Sunday in August. It was built in brick, with a belfry tower of stone added in 1824. The interior has its original simple fittings which includes box pews, a gallery and staircase. The chancel has a semi-octagonal apse.

St Mary's was replaced by Holy Trinity Church built in 1886 to the designs of W Basset-Smith. It was constructed in the neo-Gothic style with a tall spire. It is situated next to Tarleton Church of England Primary School on Church Road. Holy Trinity Church has some Robert (Mouseman) Thompson furniture and woodwork, which is notable for the mice carved on them.

There is a Methodist chapel on Church Road, and a Roman Catholic church, Our Lady Help of Christians, on Hesketh Lane.

== Geography ==
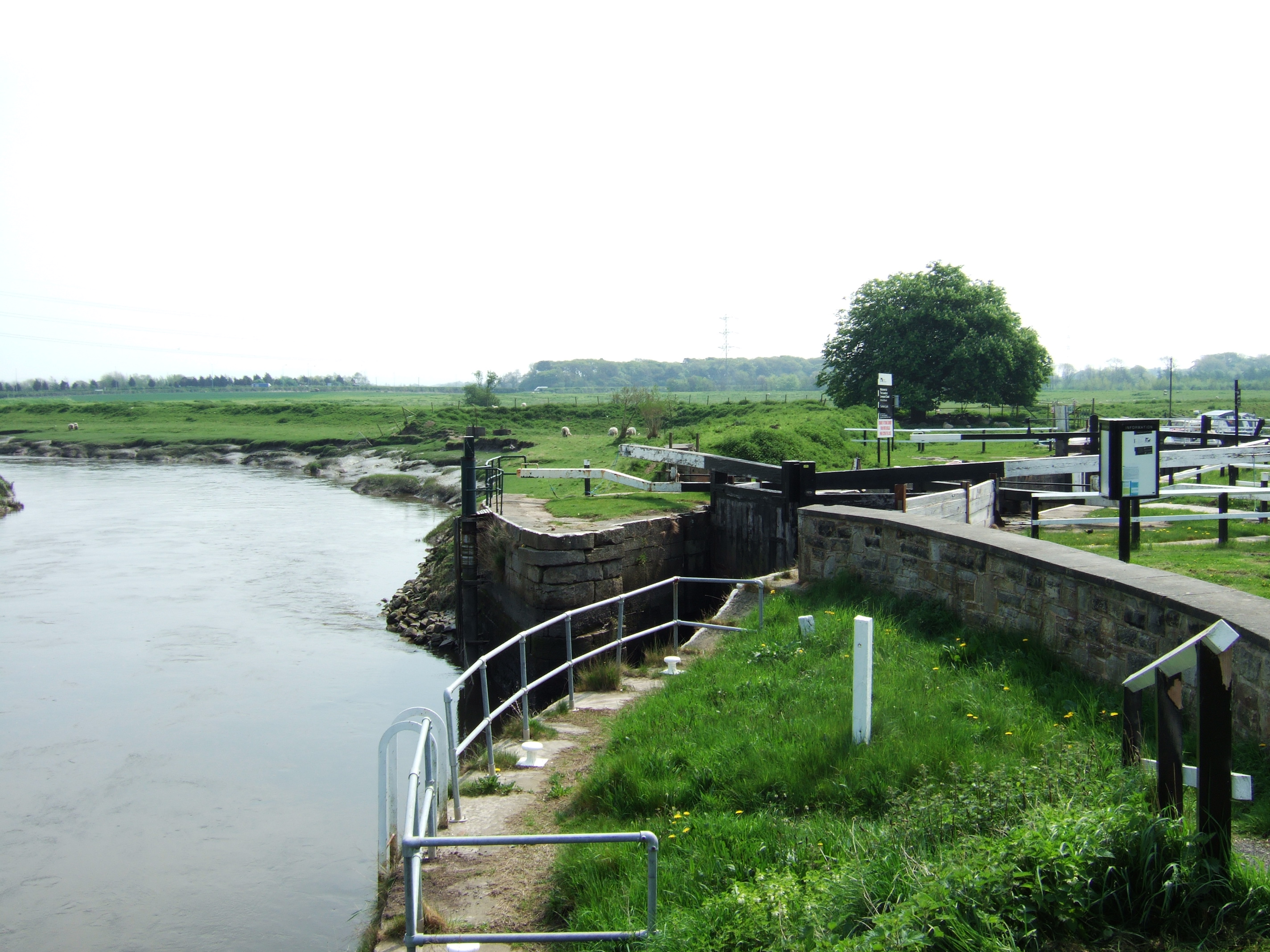
Tarleton Lock, where the Leeds and Liverpool Canal joins the River Douglas

Tarleton lies 8.5 miles (13.7 km) north-east of Ormskirk, covering 5,377 acres (2,176 ha) acres of flat land which was originally boggy towards the west. The River Douglas passes to the east and was made navigable in 1727. Tarleton includes the village of Mere Brow and the hamlet of Holmes, on the A565 to the west and Sollom, a small hamlet on the A59 to the south.

Tarleton mosses is an area of reclaimed mossland that stretches along the coastal plain from the Ribble Estuary in the north to the A565 in the south. It is a market gardening area with many glass houses. The farms and smallholdings have exploited the rich peat deposits. Beyond the smallholdings and green houses are arable fields. The built environment is dominated by ribbon development of modern bungalows along banked roads between Tarleton, Banks and Becconsall.

== Population ==
Population growth in Tarleton from 1881 to 2011
Year	1881	1891	1901	1911	1921	1931	1951	1961	1971	1981	1991	2001	2011
Population	1,900	1,772	1,800	1,997	2,115	2,407	2,774	3,001	3,618	4,545	4,781	5,350	5,652
Tarleton CP/Tn

== Demography ==
In the April 2001 census there were 2,736 females and 2,614 males living in Tarleton. The median age of population was 42 years and there were 2,571 dwellings recorded in the parish. Crime rates in the area are relatively low in comparison with the national average. The Police UK website states that in the Tarleton area there were just five incidents of street crime and 19 occasions of Anti-social behaviour during March 2012. According to the United Kingdom Census 2011, Tarleton parish had a population of 5,652.

== Economy ==
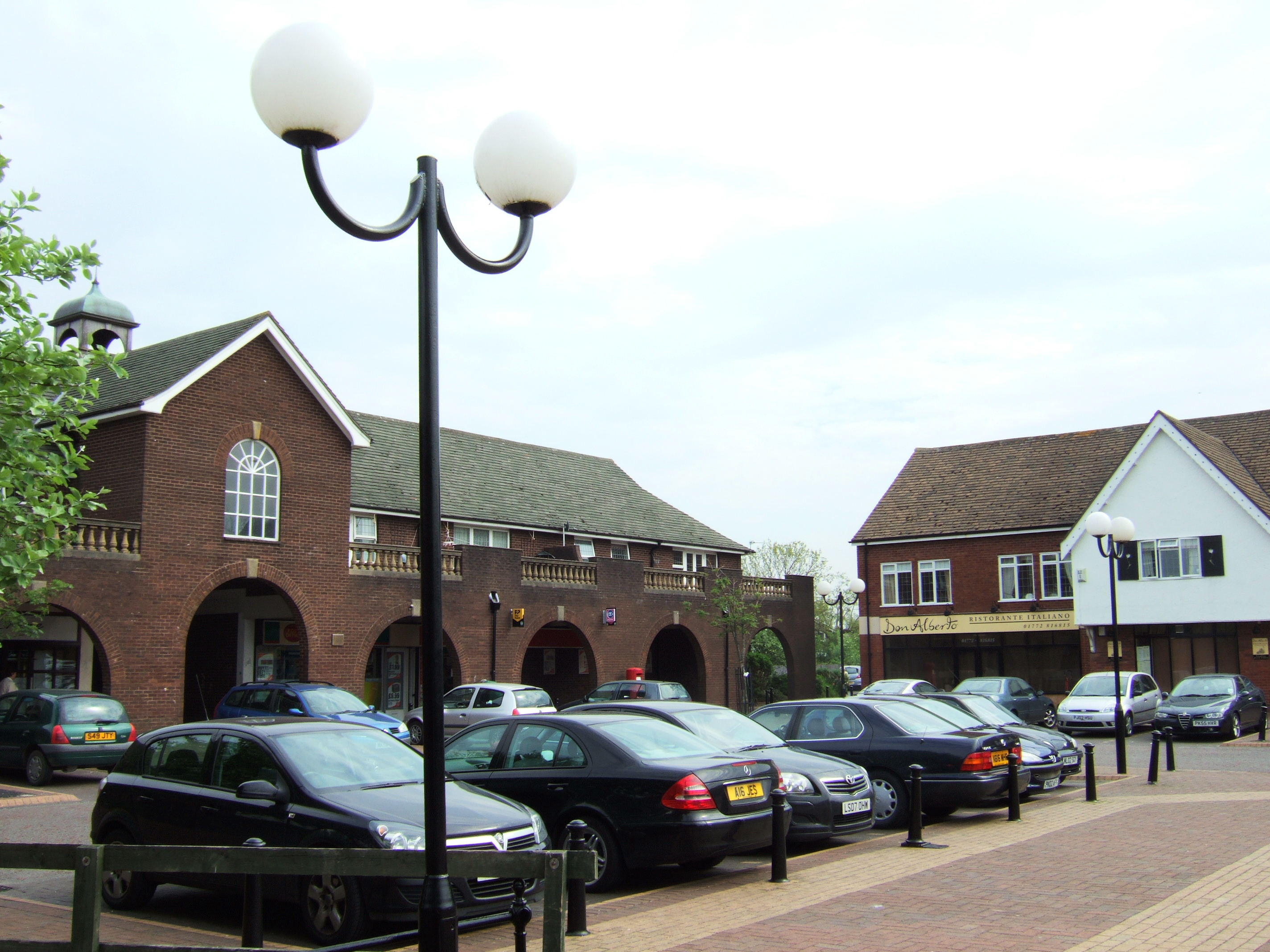
Mark Square shopping centre

The high quality soil of the former mossland means that a major economic activity in Tarleton is market gardening, particularly growing salad crops.

Mark Square is a shopping area in the village centre where there are plans to build 30 shops and a number of residential properties.

On 20 February 2024 Croftpak tomato nursery was featured in the BBC series Hairy Bikers Go West.

== Transport ==
Tarleton was served by the former Preston to Southport railway line which ran through Hesketh Bank until its closure in 1964. The Rufford Branch of the Leeds and Liverpool Canal runs into the River Douglas at Tarleton Lock and was served by a goods branch line on the railway. The A565 road and the A59 road meet at Tarleton crossroads and provide main road transport links to the villages and surrounding area. The roads bypass the village and the crossroads junction separates the village from the hamlet of Sollom.

== Local facilities ==
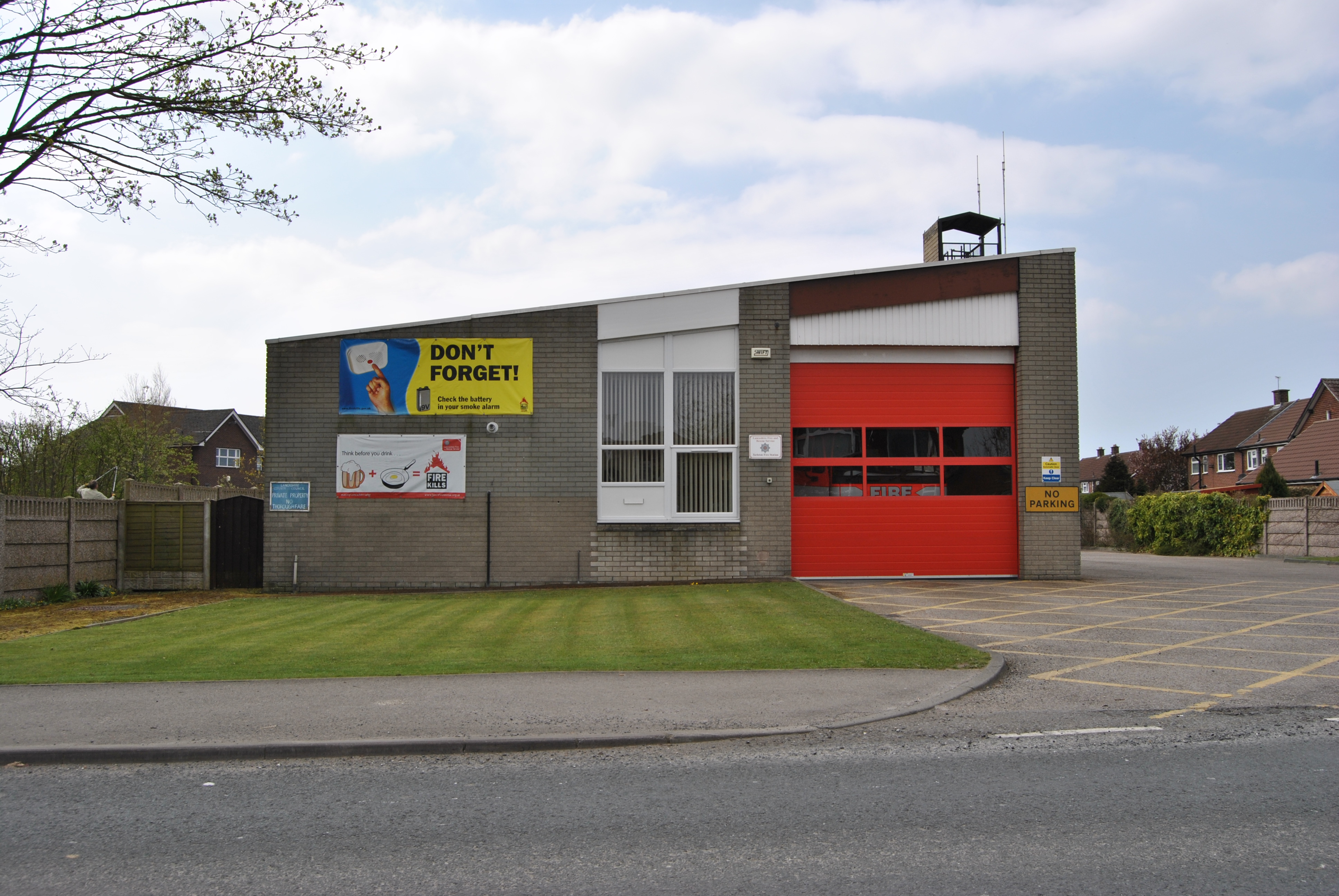
Tarleton Fire Station April 2010

Tarleton has a small public library; The fire station in the village has a training tower and houses one appliance.

Tarleton is home to football and cricket pitches on Carr Lane. The pavilion, which is adjacent to these pitches, is organised and run by Tarleton Corinthians Football Club and Tarleton Cricket Club.

Tarleton Rugby Club have their own private clubhouse and bar that is open to the community on matchdays.

== Notable people ==
A number of notable individuals were either born in Tarleton or have lived in the area.

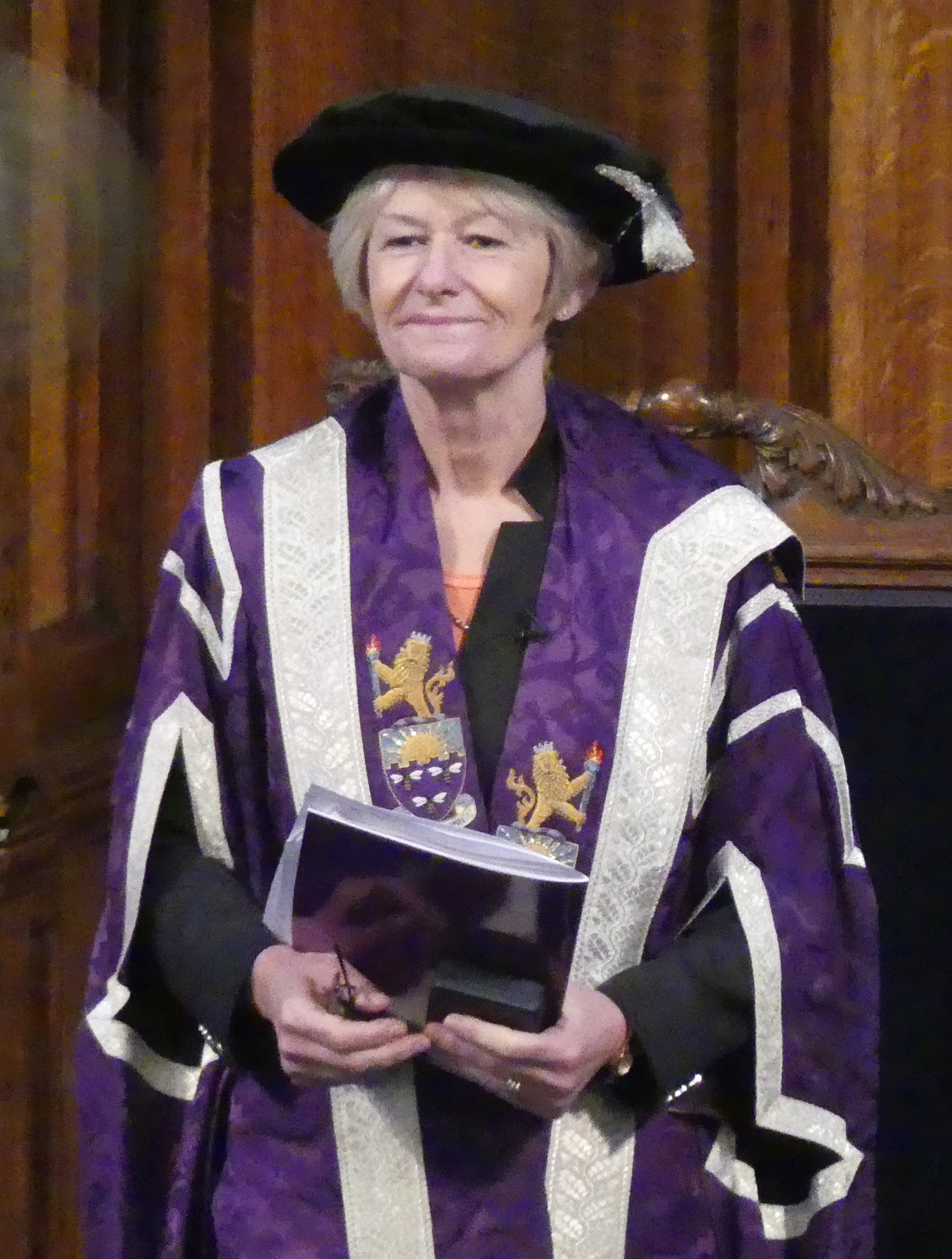
Nancy Rothwell, 2015

- Brian Iddon (born 1940), MP for Bolton South East, 1997–2010
- Dame Nancy Rothwell (born 1955), physiologist, Vice-Chancellor of the University of Manchester, 2010 to 2024
- Andrew Lancel (born c. 1975), actor, featured in TV drama Cardiac Arrest
- Jonathan Howard (born 1987), actor with credits including Dream Team, Titanic and Hollyoaks

=== Sport ===
- Dave Sutton (born 1957), footballer, played about 440 games, mainly for Huddersfield Town
- Gary Ablett (1965–2012), footballer, played 399 games for Liverpool F.C. and Everton F.C., then coach and manager of Stockport County
- Ben Williams (born 1999), footballer, played over 100 games for Cheltenham Town

== See also ==
- Listed buildings in Tarleton
