= St Mary's Church, Tarleton =

Coordinates: 53.6748°N 2.8239°W

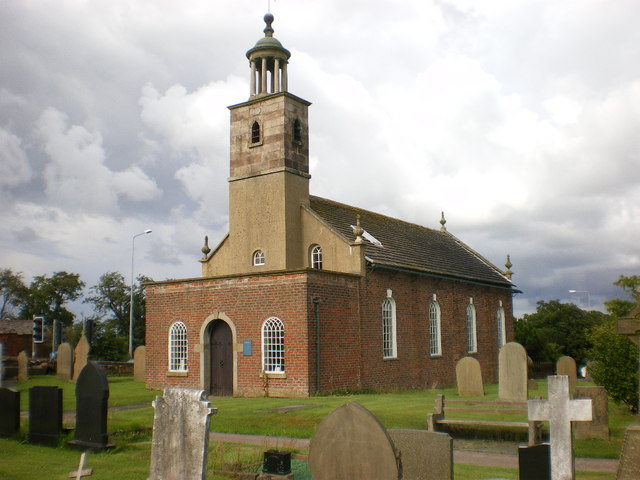
- St Mary's Church, Tarleton, from the southwest

- Location in West Lancashire
- OS grid reference: SD 456 201
- Location: Tarleton, Lancashire
- Country: England
- Denomination: Anglican
- Website: Churches Conservation Trust

Architecture
- Functional status: Redundant
- Heritage designation: Grade II*
- Designated: 11 October 1968
- Architectural type: Church
- Style: Georgian

Specifications
- Length: 47 feet 9 inches (14.55 m)
- Width: 21 feet (6.40 m)
- Materials: Brick with stone slate roofs; ashlar in upper part of tower

St Mary's Church is a redundant Anglican church on the A59 road as it passes to the south of the village of Tarleton, Lancashire, England. It is recorded in the National Heritage List for England as a designated Grade II* listed building, and is under the care of the Churches Conservation Trust. It is described by the Churches Conservation Trust as a "picturesque early Georgian chapel" with "a lovely unspoiled interior".

== History ==
The church was built on the site of a former chantry chapel, dedicated to St Helen, founded in about 1525. In the 1530s a hermitage in the chapelyard was occupied by Hugh Dobson of the Order of St Anthony. The chapel was sold to Sir Thomas Hesketh who demolished it. In 1719, Henrietta Maria Legh of Bank Hall, donated the land on which the church was built. The building costs were met by other benefactors. Legh and her heirs held the right, with the rector of Croston's approval, to nominate the curate but patronage of the church was subsequently acquired by the rector.

Additions were made in 1824, consisting of a west porch, a south gallery, and an upper stage to the tower. The church closed in 1886 when Holy Trinity Church was built nearer to the centre of the village. It was used as a mortuary chapel. St Mary's was declared redundant on 1 November 1980, and was vested in the Trust on 10 February 1982.

== Architecture ==
=== Exterior ===
St Mary's is constructed in handmade brick that was originally plastered, with stone slate roofs and with ashlar upper parts to the tower. Its plan consists of a small rectangular building in four bays, with a semi-octagonal apse, a bell-tower at the west end, and to the west of this a flat-topped porch. The church measures 47 feet 9 inches (14.55 m) by 21 feet (6.40 m), with the apse measuring 12 feet (3.66 m) by 8 feet (2.44 m). Along the north and south walls are large round-headed windows with glazing bars that are continued upwards into intersecting tracery. Above each window is a keystone, and between the windows are triangular pilasters which act as buttresses.

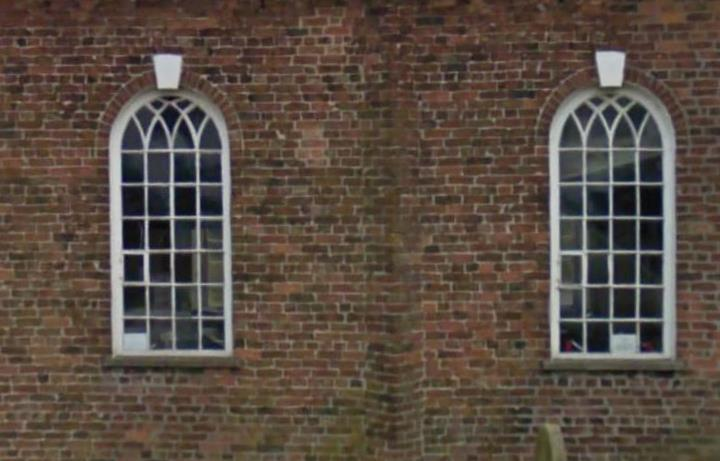
St Mary's windows on the North facing wall

The apse has a similar window on each side, leaving the east end blank. Running down the east end is a rain drain pipe, its head being decorated with the arms of Banastre of Bank, and the date 1719. On the top of each corner and on the east gable end is a flaming-urn finial. Around the summit of the apse is a modillioned cornice. At the west end of the porch is a round-headed doorway with a keystone, on each side of which is a window similar to those on the sides. Rising above this, the west end of the church and the lower part of the tower are stuccoed. On each side of the tower is a small round-headed window, and an even smaller round-headed window is in the lower part of the tower. The tower is thin and oblong. On each side of the tower, above a string course, is a louvred bell opening with a triangular head, and around the top of the tower is a moulded cornice. On its summit is a rotunda consisting of a cupola carried on columns, surmounted by a weathervane. The turret had two bells but one was moved to Holy Trinity. The remaining bell is dated 1824.

=== Interior ===
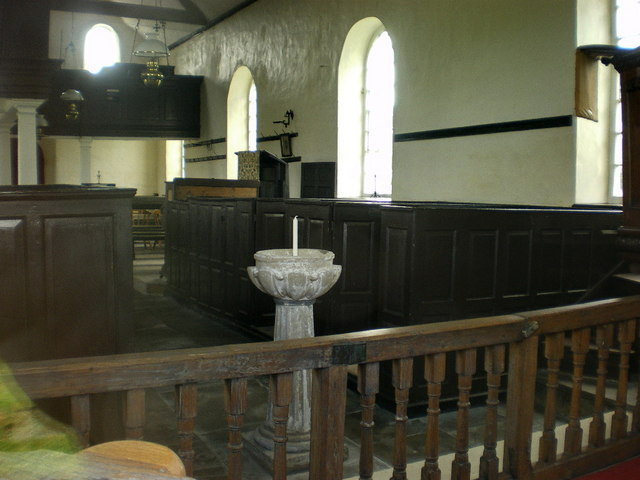
St Mary's Interior, showing font

The porch incorporates a vestry and stairs leading to the panelled gallery which is supported by square fluted columns and occupies the west and south sides. At the east end are box pews created for George Anthony Legh Keck of Bank Hall while the west end has open benches. In the centre of the north side is a reading desk. The church has an octagonal panelled pulpit, an 18th-century font in the form of a simple baluster, a 19th-century cast iron stove decorated with wreaths standing on claw feet and a flagged floor.

The church has no electricity but oil lamps are suspended over the aisle. It is unheated since the chimney for the stove was removed. The organ is a type of American harmonium which has pedals to operate its bellows.

== External features ==
Robert Crompton Fletcher, Archdeacon of Blackburn from 1901 to 1916, is buried in the churchyard.

In addition there are the war graves of four soldiers of World War I and an airman of World War II.

== Present day ==
The churchyard remains in use and is maintained by volunteers who also open the church to visitors on Heritage Open Days in September. An annual church service on the fourth Sunday in August is known as 'Old Church Sunday' when the service usually held in Holy Trinity Church is held in St Mary's. The tradition began when Holy Trinity opened in 1886, and the services transferred there.

== See also ==
- Grade II* listed buildings in Lancashire
- Listed buildings in Tarleton
- List of churches preserved by the Churches Conservation Trust in Northern England
