= Sollom =

Hamlet in Lancashire, England

Coordinates: 53.662°N 2.825°W

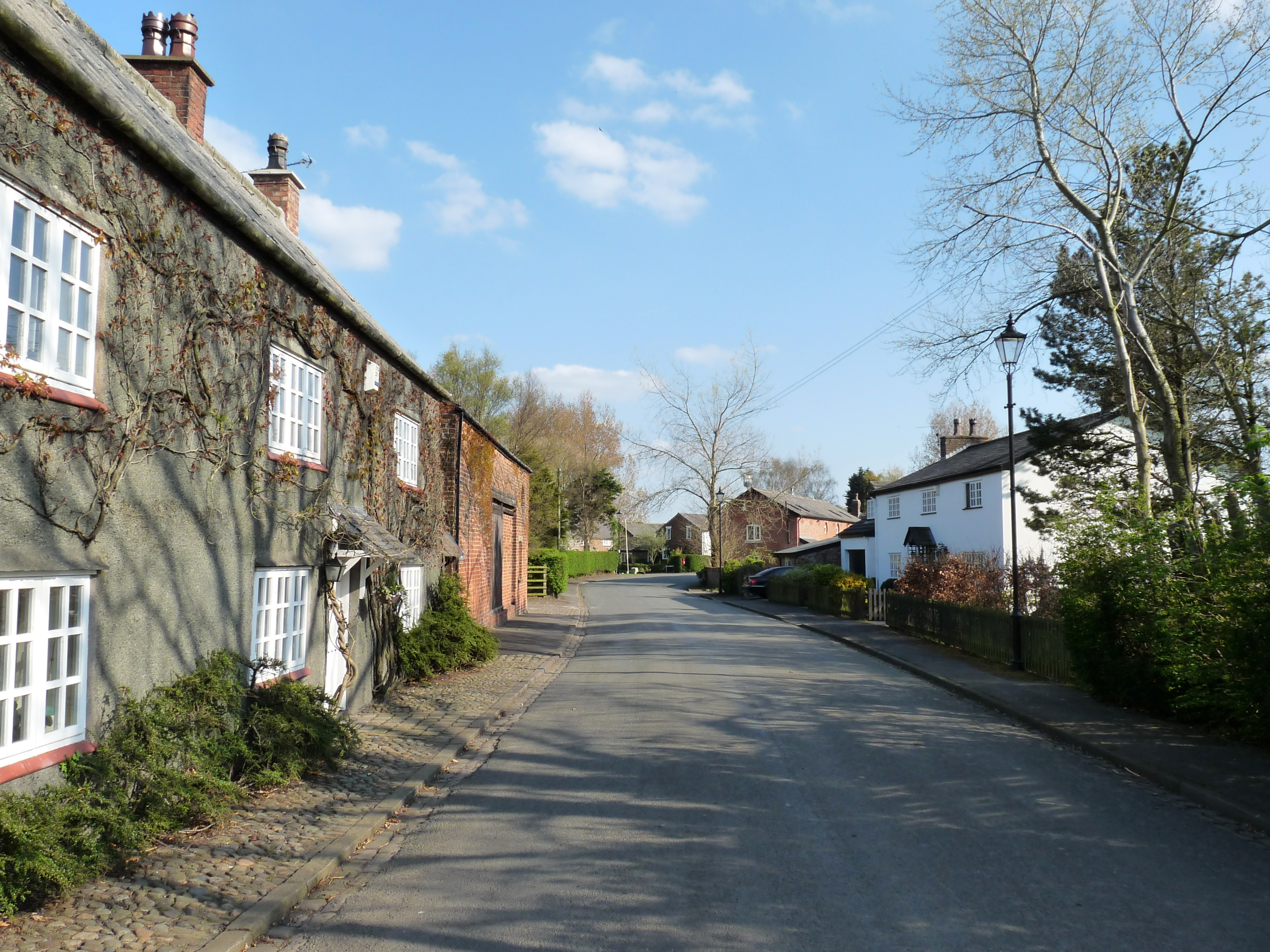
- View down Liverpool Old Road

- Location in West Lancashire Location within Lancashire
- Population: 5,350 2001 Census (Tarleton Parish)
- OS grid reference: SD454187
- Civil parish: Tarleton
- District: West Lancashire
- Shire county: Lancashire
- Region: North West
- Country: England
- Sovereign state: United Kingdom
- Post town: PRESTON
- Postcode district: PR4
- Dialling code: 01704; 01772
- Police: Lancashire
- Fire: Lancashire
- Ambulance: North West
- UK Parliament: South Ribble

Sollom is a hamlet in the parish of Tarleton, in Lancashire, England. It lies south of Tarleton and north of Rufford on the A59 road, giving the village good links to Preston, Southport and Liverpool.

Historically, the village was primarily an agricultural village thanks to the excellent soil, and farms in the area are still in use today.

== Governance ==
The village is administered by West Lancashire District Council and Tarleton parish council.

== Transport ==
The A59 road meets with the A565 road at a cross road junction with traffic lights on the border of Sollom and Tarleton. The A59 is the main road that runs through the hamlet. The nearest railway station is at Rufford, which is on the Preston-Ormskirk Branch service. The Rufford branch of the Leeds and Liverpool Canal passes through Sollom, which has its own lock.

== Landmarks ==
A feature of the hamlet is a school now converted into three separate houses. The Bayleaf Restaurant was formerly the Ram's Head public house which was extended to create an American themed restaurant before becoming an Indian Restaurant, the building is of significant age, but remains derelict since the restaurant closed in 2007. The restaurant has now been demolished, and redeveloped into an Aldi store in 2022. In 2008 the land occupied by a derelict petrol garage was re-developed into a modern country style complex of offices which sits on the Sollom corner of the A59 and A565 traffic light junction.

== See also ==
- Listed buildings in Tarleton
