= Tarleton Academy =

Coordinates: 53.6854°N 2.8301°W

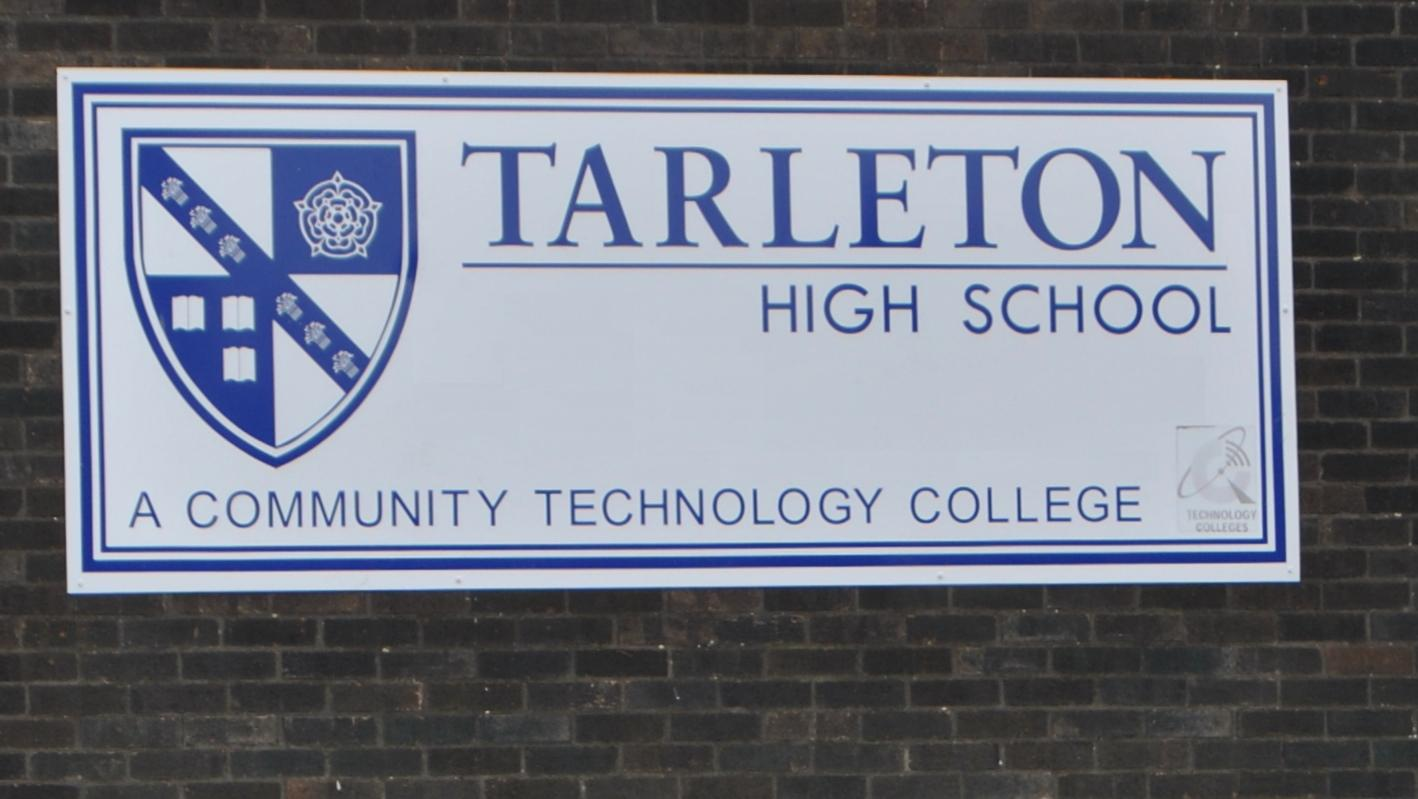

Location
- Hesketh Lane; Tarleton, Lancashire, PR4 6AQ; England

Information
- Type: Academy
- Established: 1961
- Local authority: Lancashire
- Department for Education URN: 137768 Tables
- Ofsted: Reports
- Headteacher: Scott Parker
- Gender: Coeducational
- Age: 11 to 16
- Enrolment: 691 (2025)
- Capacity: 750
- Website: http://www.tarletonacademy.org/

Tarleton Academy is a secondary Academy situated in Tarleton, Lancashire, England; the headteacher is Scott Parker. The school caters for 11 to 16-year-olds. The academy completed building renewal in 2023 at a total cost of 23 million pounds, opening in April 2023.

The school celebrated its silver jubilee in September 1987.

== History ==
The school was established in 1961 as Tarleton County Secondary Modern, under the headship of Mr George Kitchen. Built over 12 months at a cost of over £140,000 and designed to accommodate 300 pupils, it was officially opened in May 1962 by Sir Douglas Glover, who remarked it was "the most lovely and attractive country school" he had seen. Building construction used a reinforced concrete frame with external black panels and grey brick. It was the first school in the county to utilise this form of construction.

Headteacher George Kitchen was taking on his first headship role, having previously served as deputy headteacher at Wickersley Secondary Modern School in Rotherham. Upon first opening, the school roll was 261 students with 12 staff. Construction had not been fully completed by the start of the first term, with unfinished classrooms, while the stage was repurposed as a canteen space. By the early 1970s, the school's intake had grown to the point of requiring additional teaching space, with a four-storey teaching block replacing the former front lawn and new practical classrooms at the rear.

It became fully comprehensive in 1972, along with the opening of new classroom buildings, a swimming pool and an increase in teaching staff. By 1975, it was reported that there were concerns around the pupil to staff ratio at the school. The school's total cohort was then 827 students, which was expected to rise to around 1,000 several years later. Budget cuts to the education sector were at that time anticipated, while there was a pause on the recruitment of replacing departing support staff. Around this time, the first "Friends of Tarleton High School Association" group was formed from governors, parents and staff.

In summer 1981, the school's original headteacher and deputy headteacher of 20 years, Mr George Kitchen and Mrs Jean Dunn respectively, each retired. The new headteacher for the start of the 1981 academic year was Mr David Winthrop.

== Facilities ==
The school has its own swimming pool for internal and community use, which originally opened on the school's site in October 1971. Plans to build a sports hall were reported in 1991, when a proposed £350,000 scheme was to be part funded by £180,000 from the council and £75,000 from the Sports Council, however Lancashire County Council failed to commit funds to the scheme and it was shelved. In 2003, the school secured a £850,000 bid to build a new sports hall to accommodate four badminton courts, and was completed in 2004.

The school's facilities were noted by the Southport Visiter in 1999, who reported on the facilities available, the school's partnership with Runshaw College in running evening classes and its position close to the top of local league tables.

== Academy status ==
In late November 2011, as part of the school's conversion to Academy status, the Governing Body announced that the school would be renamed as Tarleton Academy from January 2012.

== Notable former pupils ==
- Gavin Blyth, television producer and journalist
