= Scarisbrick (surname) =

Scarisbrick, also found as Scarsbrick, Scarsbrook, Scarasbrick and Scarrisbrick, is a toponymic surname of English origin, derived from the parish of Scarisbrick in Lancashire. Notable people with the surname include:

== Scarisbrick ==
- Andy Scarisbrick, former in-concert guitarist of British music group The Overlanders
- Diana Scarisbrick (1928–2024), English art historian
- Charles Scarisbrick (1801–1860), English landowner and collector
- Edward Scarisbrick also known as Edward Neville (1639–1709), English Jesuit priest
- Jack Scarisbrick (1928–2026), English historian
- John Scarisbrick, photographer and former singer of Swedish death metal band Morbid
- Neil Scarisbrick (born 1970), British bobsledder
- Nuala Scarisbrick (1939–2021), English charity founder, spouse of Jack Scarisbrick
- Thomas Scarisbrick (1874–1933), British politician
- William Benedict Scarisbrick, Roman Catholic Bishop of Port-Louis
- John Plessington (c.1637–1679) also known as William Scarisbrick, English saint

== Scarsbrook ==
- Louie McCarthy-Scarsbrook (born 1986), English rugby league player
- Stanley Scarsbrook (1908–?), English athlete

== See also ==
- Scarisbrick baronets
- Michael Hastings, Baron Hastings of Scarisbrick
