= Everard Scarisbrick =

Sir Everard Talbot Scarisbrick, 2nd Baronet (1896–1955) was an English landowner and race car enthusiast.

== Life ==
His father Thomas Scarisbrick, the 1st Baronet and often known as Sir Talbot Scarisbrick, married in 1895 an American heiress Josephine Ethel Chamberlain, youngest daughter of William Selah Chamberlain of Cleveland, Ohio; her sister Jeanie Willson Chamberlain also married into the same extended family, her husband being Herbert Naylor-Leyland, grandson of Charles Scarisbrick and so first cousin of Thomas Scarisbrick. Everard was the elder of two sons, his younger brother being Ronald Charles Talbot Scarisbrick (1899–1913).

Scarisbrick served as a 2nd lieutenant in the King's Regiment (Liverpool), having signed up on 4 October 1914. He resigned his commission for health reasons on 9 March 1915. He was in the 7th Battalion; it was a territorial unit drawn from areas of Lancashire including Bootle and Southport, and moved to Le Havre on 8 March 1915.

In 1933, on the death of his father, Scarisbrick became 2nd Baronet. He won on appeal in 1939 a leading case on compensation, Robinson v Scarisbrick. In his death in 1955, the baronetcy became extinct; he was survived by his wife.

== Rabbit the First ==
In 1921 Scarisbrick had a custom "Benz-Mercedes" car made from a 230hp Benz WWI aero engine, the work being carried out by C. H. Crowe & Co. of London. In it, he was the victor in 1923 at the speed trials on Fanø beach. It was later bought, in 1930, by Bradley Martin, Jr. of Long Island, under the mistaken impression that it was a "Chitty" Bentley. Peter Helck wrote of "Rabbit the First", as it was named:

Its 6 cylinder 230 hp Benz Aero engine is from a German plane shot down in France in the Kaiser War. About 1920 it was anchored in a 1909 chain-drive Mercedes chassis [...] It was given a restoration job by John Oliveau and later sold to the Ellis brothers of Sea Cliff, Long Island, who, after giving it some hard usage, offered to sell. Austin Clark and Jim Melton graciously withdrew their own acquisitive interests, the former arranging for its sale to us. Leo Peters got it in running shape after which it began its long hibernation. Eventually the awareness of its decay prompted the thought of getting some mobile pleasure from it before it was too late, so I induced Charles [Lytle] to go along in a restoration by Jim Hoe.

Another nickname was the "Scariscrow", a portmanteau from Scarisbrick and Crowe. Helck commented that the car did resemble Louis Zborowski's "hybrids", the "Chitty-Bang-Bangs". Harding wrote in 1968 of "Rabbit the First" that it turned up

at a small speed trial at Southall before the war, the original radiator having been replaced by one from a six-cylinder Bentley. [...] it was shipped to America as the genuine Chitty I or possibly, when the identity of its engine was discovered, as Chitty II. It has been meticulously restored, with a Locomobile radiator. But the fact remains that only one true Zborowski Chitty-Bang-Bang now remains.

The car returned to Fanø in 1999, shipped in a container from Maryland for the Fanø Motorlsbet. It featured in a 2020 episode of Jay Leno's Garage.

== Mercedes-Benz 500K ==
In the 1930s Scarisbrick acquired a Mercedes-Benz 500K with chassis number 123689. It is extant and has been on the market.

== Residences ==
Control of the Greaves Hall estate passed to Everard Scarisbrick with the Scarisbrick Settlement Act of 1918, a private act. This was part of resettlement by discretionary trusts that later gave him a lifetime interest in most of the Scarisbrick estates. Scarisbrick Hall returned to this branch of the family in 1923, bought by Everard's father; as 2nd Baronet, Everard Scarisbrick sold it in 1946. At the end of his life, his residence was Wiveton Barn, Holt, Norfolk.

== Family ==
Scarisbrick married in 1919, as her second husband, Nadine Celeste Sybil Brumm, daughter of Charles Brumm of Birkdale and his wife Laura Beckmann, a painter. She had married firstly, in 1909, Leonard Williamson of Southport, described that year as "one of the most enthusiastic motorists of the north of England".

Williamson died in 1929, having married in 1919 Lilian Byrne, a music hall singer. His daughter from his first marriage, Nadine Leonora Williamson, who married Philip Freeman-Taylor, was Nadine Celeste Sybil Brumm's only child.
