= Scarisbrick baronets =

Extinct baronetcy in the Baronetage of the United Kingdom

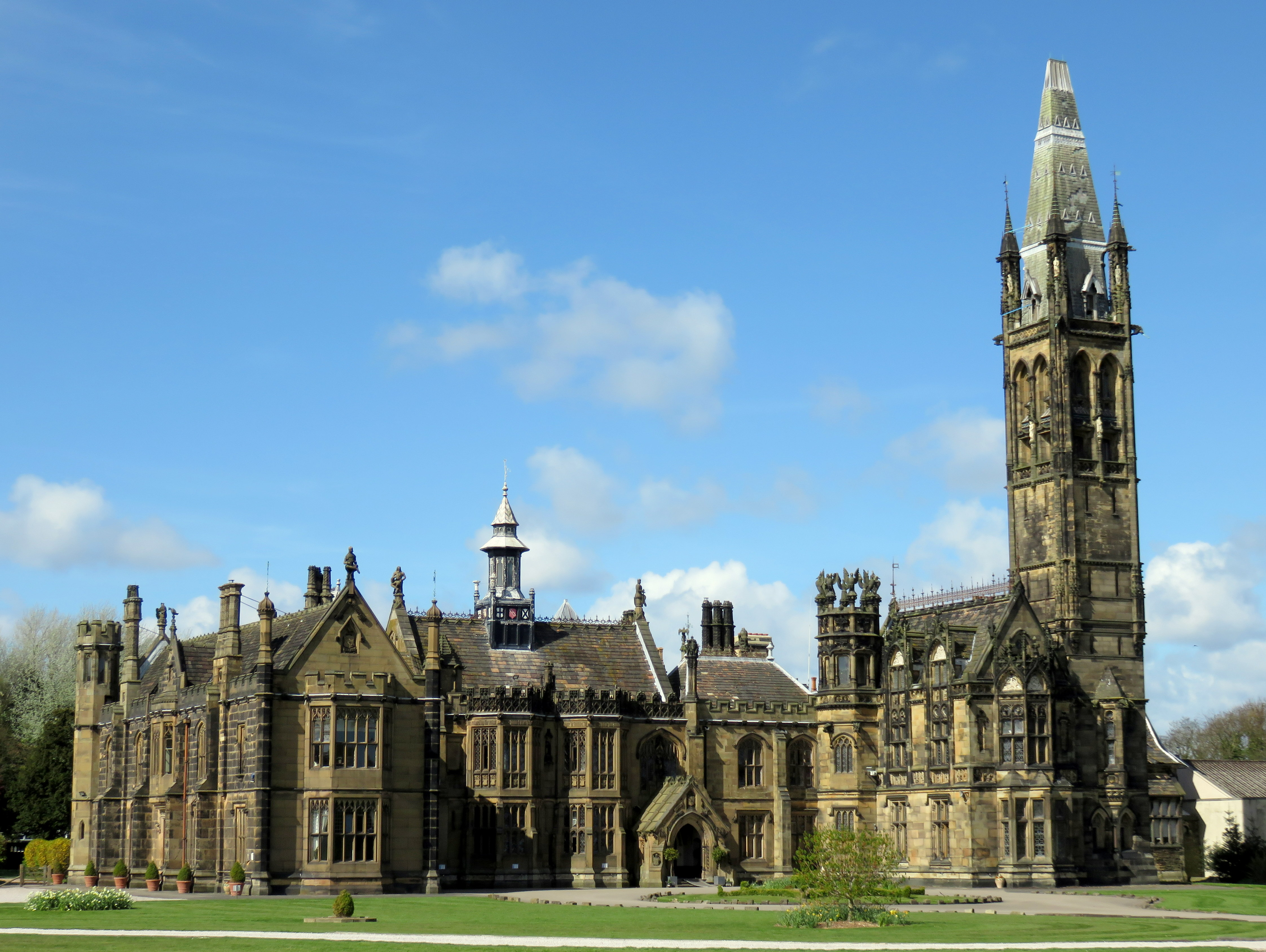
Scarisbrick Hall, the seat of the Scarisbrick baronets

The Scarisbrick baronetcy, of Greaves Hall in the Parish of North Meols in the County Palatine of Lancaster, was a title in the Baronetage of the United Kingdom. It was created on 17 July 1909 for the Liberal politician Thomas Scarisbrick. He was the son of Sir Charles Scarisbrick, Mayor of Southport. The title became extinct on the death of the 2nd Baronet in 1955.

For a period from 1923, the family seat was Scarisbrick Hall, Lancashire.

== Scarisbrick baronets, of Greaves Hall (1909) ==
- Sir Thomas Talbot Leyland Scarisbrick, 1st Baronet (1874–1933)
- Sir Everard Talbot Scarisbrick, 2nd Baronet (1896–1955)

== Arms ==
Coat of arms of Scarisbrick baronets

Crest
Between two trefoils slipped Vert a falcon close Proper belled and jessed and charged on the breast with a mullet of six points Or.
Escutcheon
Argent a saltire engrailed parted and fretty between two mullets of six points in pale all Sable.
Motto
Patentia Vincit Omnia

Baronetage of the United Kingdom
Preceded by Truscott baronets	Scarisbrick baronets of Greaves Hall; 17 July 1909	Succeeded by Rose baronets
