= Charles Scarisbrick =

English landowner and art collector

Charles Scarisbrick (24 June 1801 – 6 May 1860), from a Lancashire recusant background, was an English Catholic landowner, businessman and art collector.

== Early life and background ==
He was the son of Thomas Eccleston (died 1809) and his wife Eleonora Clifton. He changed his birth surname multiple times, in each case tied to property.

His father, original surname Scarisbrick, changed surname to Eccleston in 1802/3, on inheriting an estate at Eccleston, near St Helens. He is often known as Thomas Scarisbrick Eccleston. His wife Eleonora was the daughter of Thomas Clifford of Westby and his wife Jane Bertie, daughter of Willoughby Bertie, 3rd Earl of Abingdon. The couple were married in 1784. They had three sons and four daughters. William, the second son, died in his father's lifetime.

Of the daughters:

- Ann(e), the eldest, married in 1807 Sir Thomas Windsor Hunloke, 5th Baronet.
- Elizabeth, the third, made a first cousin marriage to Edward Clifton, son of Eleonora's brother John.

Thomas (1785–1833), the elder son, changed his surname back to Scarisbrick in 1810. He married Sybella Georgiana ffarington of Shawe Hall, Lancashire, but left no issue.

Charles, the younger surviving son, also changed his surname in 1810, to Dicconson, as heir to the Wrightington estate of the Jacobite Catholic Dicconson family; and then back to Scarisbrick in 1833. He attended Wigan Grammar School and Stonyhurst College.

== From 1833 ==
Scarisbrick was litigious, and after the death of their elder brother Thomas Scarisbrick in 1833, fought and won a succession of legal cases against his sisters Mary and Elizabeth for the Scarisbrick estate, starting in 1838. The House of Lords in 1847 upheld in his favour an appeal, in a case turning on a "shifting clause" in a will, a decision of 1840 by Lord Holland, Chancellor of the Duchy Court of Lancaster.

In 1839 Scarisbrick was High Sheriff of Lancashire.

== Landowner and business interests ==
Plans by Scarisbrick to buy into the west Lancashire coast received a setback in the early 1840s, when Peter Hesketh-Fleetwood reneged on an agreement to sell land there to him, instead passing it to his brother Charles Hesketh, rector of North Meols. In 1843 Scarisbrick bought an estate at North Meols, from Henry de Hoghton, son of Sir Henry Bold-Hoghton, 8th Baronet, for £132,000. He was then able to buy further land in the area, from Charles Hesketh.

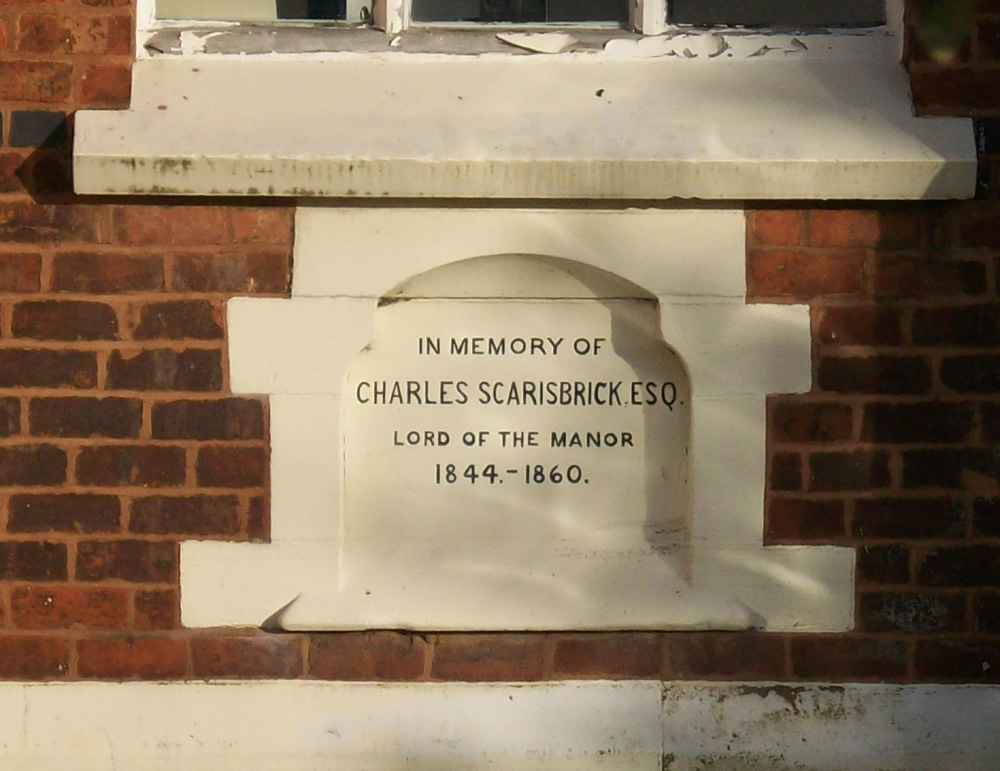
Memorial to Charles Scarisbrick at the Crossens primary school, north Southport

As a result, from about 1850 Scarisbrick was a major landowner in Southport, then an expanding resort, with Charles Hesketh still holding some land in the north of Southport.

Scarisbrick set up a white lead business at Appley Bridge in 1850. He was also a successful coalowner; he opened the Greenslate(s) colliery, near Shevington on the Wrightington estate, in 1855. There were deaths there in 1856, after a firedamp explosion.

== Collections and legacy ==
From 1833, when he inherited from his brother Thomas, Scarisbrick based in London collected art; and stored it in Scarisbrick Hall. His London address, by 1839, was 11 Suffolk Street, Pall Mall. He was a patron of the painter John Martin, commissioning copies of his works Joshua Commanding the Sun to Stand Still upon Gibeon and Fall of the Rebel Angels.

Scarisbrick came to employ the architect and designer A. W. N. Pugin. They met through his interest in Gothic "architectural salvage", wooden carvings sourced largely from continental Europe, stocked by the broker and dealer Edward Hull of Wardour Street, London.

In 1848 Scarisbrick bought A Man Holding a Glove by Jan Gossart, now in the National Gallery, London, from the sale of the collection of William Webb. In 1851 he bought The Preaching of John the Baptist by Bartholomeus Breenbergh, now in the Metropolitan Museum of Art.

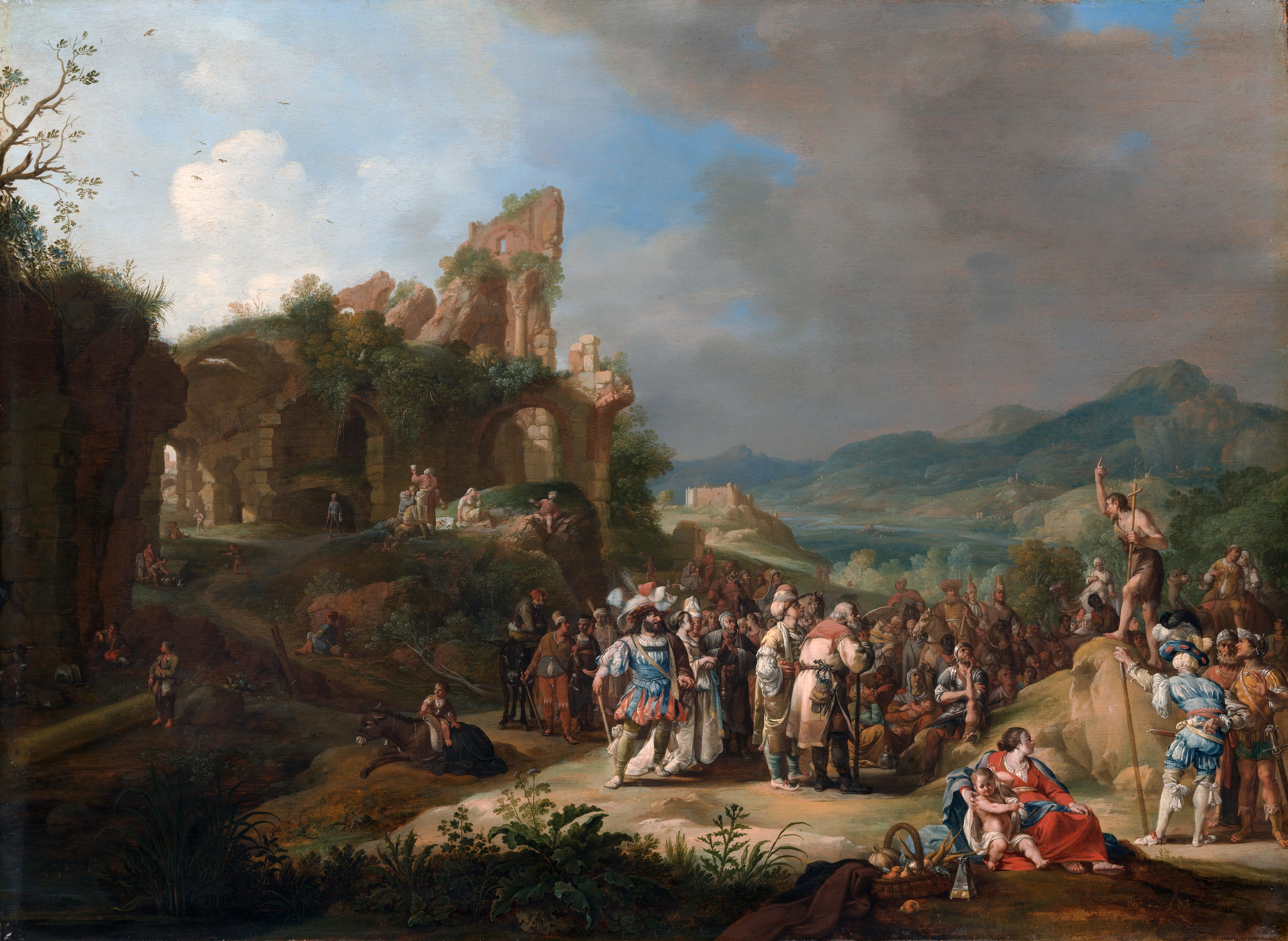
The Preaching of John the Baptist by Bartholomeus Breenbergh, 1634

In 1861 Scarisbrick's Old Masters were sold by Christie's. Over four days, more than 700 lots were sold. As part of the same sales, running from 10 May to 25 May, the British Museum bought his collection of drawings and engravings by Jacques Callot. Considered the major London sales of the year, they were preceded by sales of oak furniture, carvings and the library in November 1860.

== Scarisbrick Hall ==
Plans for Scarisbrick Hall for Thomas Scarisbrick Eccleston, the elder, made by Humphrey Repton and John Adey Repton at the beginning of the 19th century, were not acted upon. The Hall was remodelled for Thomas Scarisbrick, the younger, around 1815 in the Gothic style, to designs of the Liverpool joiner John Slater and Thomas Rickman. Then parts of the present Victorian Gothic building were altered from 1837 to designs by Pugin, for Charles Scarisbrick. For the interior, Pugin used particularly 15th-century Flemish wood carvings collected by Scarisbrick.

It has been suggested that Edmund Thomas Parris was responsible for interior decorations at the Hall. Works including scenes from the Roman de la Rose and family portraits have been attributed to him on grounds of style, but lack documentation. Parris carried out such work at Johnstown Castle. Hasted's guidebook for the Hall pointed out the professional links of both Parris and Pugin to Thomas and William Grieve, scene painters.

E. W. Pugin, son of A. W. N. Pugin who had died in 1852, took over planned work at the Hall in the months after Charles Scarisbrick's death in 1860, for his sister Lady Anne.

== Scarisbrick chapel ==
A Catholic chapel had existed for many years at the Hall, and up to the 1773 Suppression of the Society of Jesus there was a close connection with the Jesuit order. In 1791 John Hurst, a Douai College priest from Broughton-in-the-Fylde was assigned there. Thomas Anselm Kenyon OSB from Warrington, on Benedictine mission from 1801, was at Scarisbrick in 1802.

In 1812, when the old Hall was being demolished, Louis-Joseph Dorival, formerly a parish priest at Courtieux in France, converted a barn in the township of Scarisbrick for Catholic worship. With recognition from 1821, this chapel was the base for a Benedictine mission from 1824.

In 1846 Charles Scarisbrick enlarged the chapel; he bought the 2 acres (0.81 ha) plot on which it stood in 1860. He was buried there, one report describing the chapel as located in Bescar.

Relics associated with James Smith, titular bishop of Calliopolis and the Hall chapel were found at the Scarisbrick chapel in 1870. The new church St Elizabeth's, built by the de Castéja family of Scarisbrick Hall in the late 1880s, was constructed alongside the chapel, known as St Mary's.

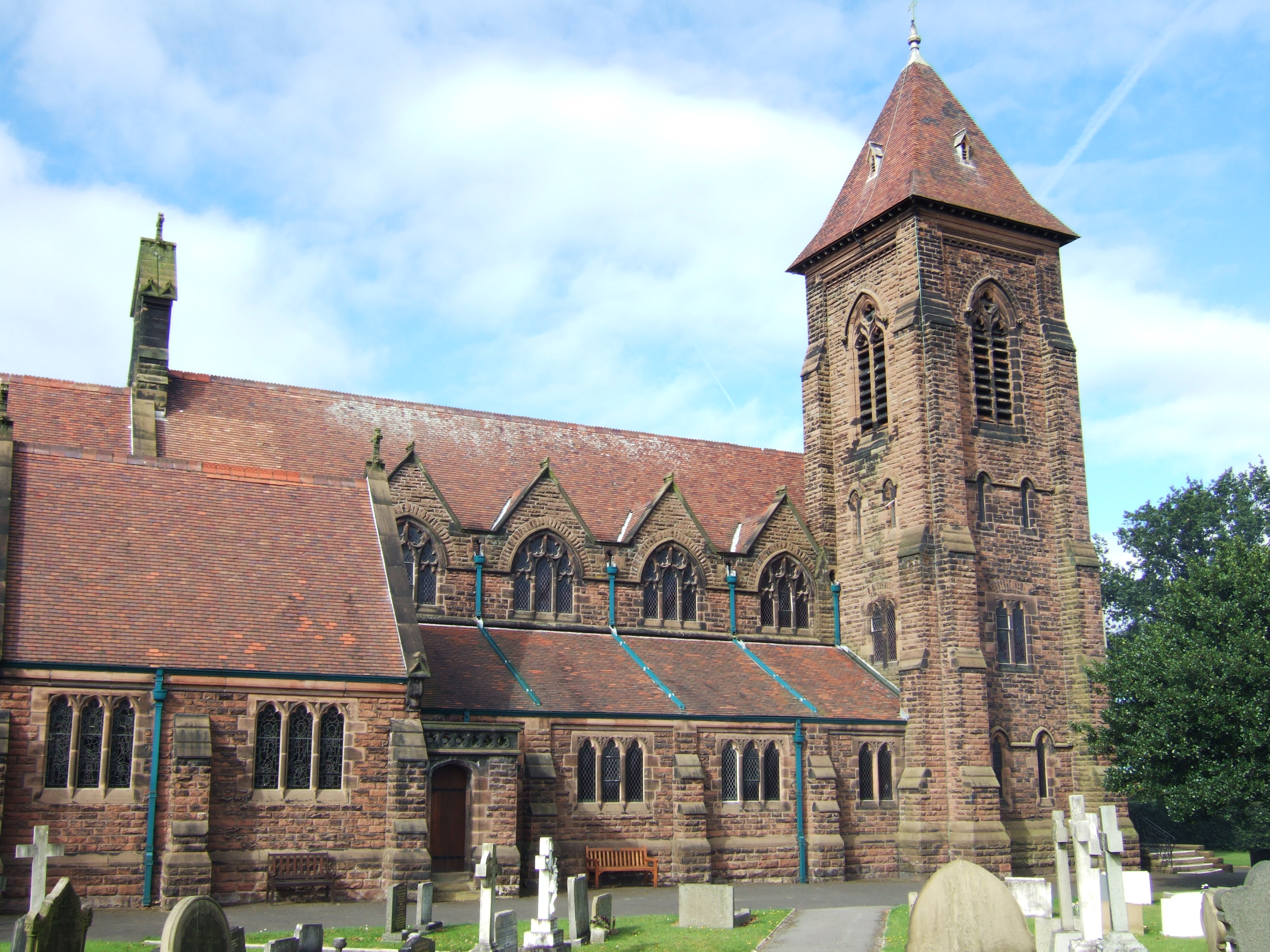
St Elizabeth's Church, Scarisbrick, 2007 photograph

== Death ==
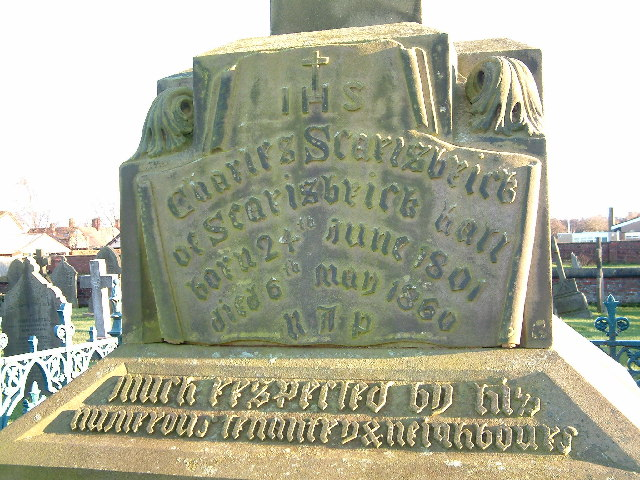
Gravestone of Charles Scarisbrick in the churchyard of St Elizabeth's, Bescar

Charles Scarisbrick died on 6 May 1860, reputedly the "wealthiest commoner in Lancashire", and was buried on 12 May at the Scarisbrick chapel churchyard, in a small private ceremony. The officiant was Thomas Maurus Margison OSB (1814–1891), until 1857 chaplain at Wrightington, where there was a Catholic chapel. Notably, "walls and fences were levelled" for the funeral procession from Scarisbrick Hall to the chapel.

== Family ==
Scarisbrick had three children with his mistress Mary Ann Braithwaite, and the family home was in London. Auction proceeds from 1861 in the amount of £45,000 from the collections were put in a trust for the children. The Pall Mall Budget announced on 8 May 1874 the death in Hanau of "Mrs. C. Scarisbrick" of Palace Gate.

The two sons were listed in 1883 as major landowners in Lancashire:

The elder son William Scarisbrick (1837–1904) died aged 66, at Wiesbaden. He was twice married, and was the father of Charles Frederick Maria Scarisbrick. He married in 1859 Sophie Spangenberg (1826–1918), daughter of Friedrich Spangenberg and Sophie Karoline Faber.

The second son, Sir Charles Scarisbrick (1839–1923), was Mayor of Southport in 1902 and was knighted in 1903. He married in 1860 Bertha Petronella Schonfeld. Thomas Scarisbrick, 1st Baronet was his son. There was another son who died young, and two daughters who took German husbands.

The only daughter Mary Anne married Tom Naylor-Leyland of Nantclwyd Hall, Denbighshire, and was mother of Herbert Naylor-Leyland, 1st Baronet.

== Will ==
Two of those present at Scarbrick's funeral were William Hawkshead Talbot and Thomas Part, named in Scarisbrick's 1857 will as his executors and trustees. Talbot was steward of Scarisbrick's estates, which he ran from Wrightington Hall.

=== Estates passing to sisters ===
Entailed estates including Sacrisbrick Hall passed to his sister Anne. The Wrightington estate passed to the younger sister Elizabeth Clifton, who died in 1863.

=== Southport settlements on the children ===
Rogers wrote

At the time of his death in 1860 [Scarisbrick] owned in excess of 30,000 acres (12,000 ha) stretching across North Meols, Scarisbrick, Eccleston, Wrightington, Wigan, Halsall and Downholland. But his most crucial acquisition was the land he purchased in 1842/3 which formed the heart of Southport's future development. It was the Southport property which Scarisbrick settled on his three illegitimate children and it was they who became beneficiaries of their father's foresight and business acumen.

The Victoria County History of Lancashire noted in 1907 that Charles Scarisbrick "had natural children, on whom he settled part of his estates, now in the hands of the Scarisbrick Trustees."

Through successive generations, the Scarisbrick and Hesketh families collaborated in the development of Southport. A private act of Parliament, the Scarisbrick Estate Act 1877 (40 & 41 Vict. c. 6 Pr.), gave the Scarisbrick Trustees further powers to make real estate deals. They met with local opposition, particularly from the Southport Corporation, and the Southport Improvement Act 1885 (48 & 49 Vict. c. cxxii) gave the corporation scope for acting against the families. The way the trustees operated the system of leaseholds in Southport came under close scrutiny in 1889, with a parliamentary enquiry looking into ground rents and leasehold enfranchisement. The partnership came to an end in 1926–7, when both families sold off their holdings.
