= St Mark's Church, Scarisbrick =

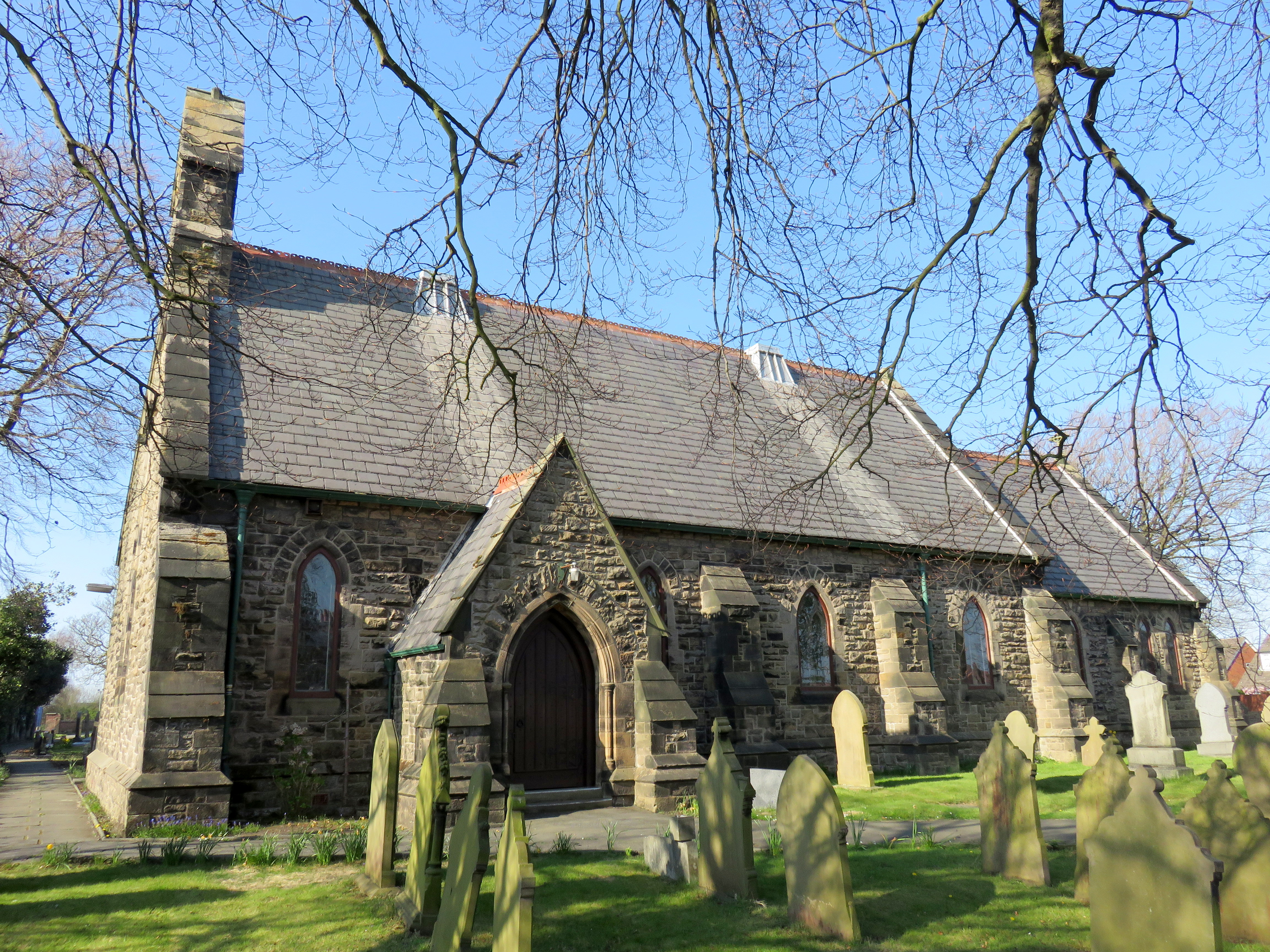
- St Mark's Church from the south

- Location in West Lancashire
- 53.613685°N 2.940701°W
- OS grid reference: SD 37774 13452
- Location: Scarisbrick, Lancashire
- Country: England
- Denomination: Anglican
- Website: St Mark's Church

History
- Status: Parish church
- Dedication: St Mark
- Consecrated: 19 April 1853

Architecture
- Functional status: Active
- Architect(s): George Shaw; William Edward Willink
- Architectural type: Church
- Style: c. 1300
- Years built: 1848–51

Specifications
- Materials: Sandstone

Administration
- Province: York
- Diocese: Liverpool
- Archdeaconry: Wigan and West Lancashire
- Deanery: Ormskirk
- Parish: Scarisbrick

St Mark's Church stands on the corner of Southport Road and Jacksmere Lane in Scarisbrick, Lancashire, England. Built in 1848–51, it is an active Anglican parish church in the deanery of Ormskirk, the archdeaconry of Warrington, and the diocese of Liverpool. The parish and benefice includes The Good Shepherd Mission, a tin chapel also located in Scarisbrick on Smithy Lane.

== History ==
The township of Scarisbrick was originally part of the ecclesiastical parish of Ormskirk, and St Mark's Church was first built as a chapel of ease to the Church of St Peter and St Paul. A scheme to build the new church was initiated by E. J. G. Hornby, vicar of Ormskirk (1846–1850), and land was provided by Charles Scarisbrick of Scarisbrick Hall. It was built in 1848–51 to a design by George Shaw of Saddleworth, and consecrated on 19 April 1853 by the Bishop of Chester.

Scarisbrick became an independent parish on 14 December 1869, with the Reverend W. R. Ramsden as its first vicar. In 1878 the Marquis and Marchioness de Castéja gave additional land to St Mark's in order to extend the churchyard and build a school. Enlargements to the church building were made in 1908 by William Edward Willink of Liverpool, with the addition of a new vestry and porch and various alterations to the interior.

== Description ==
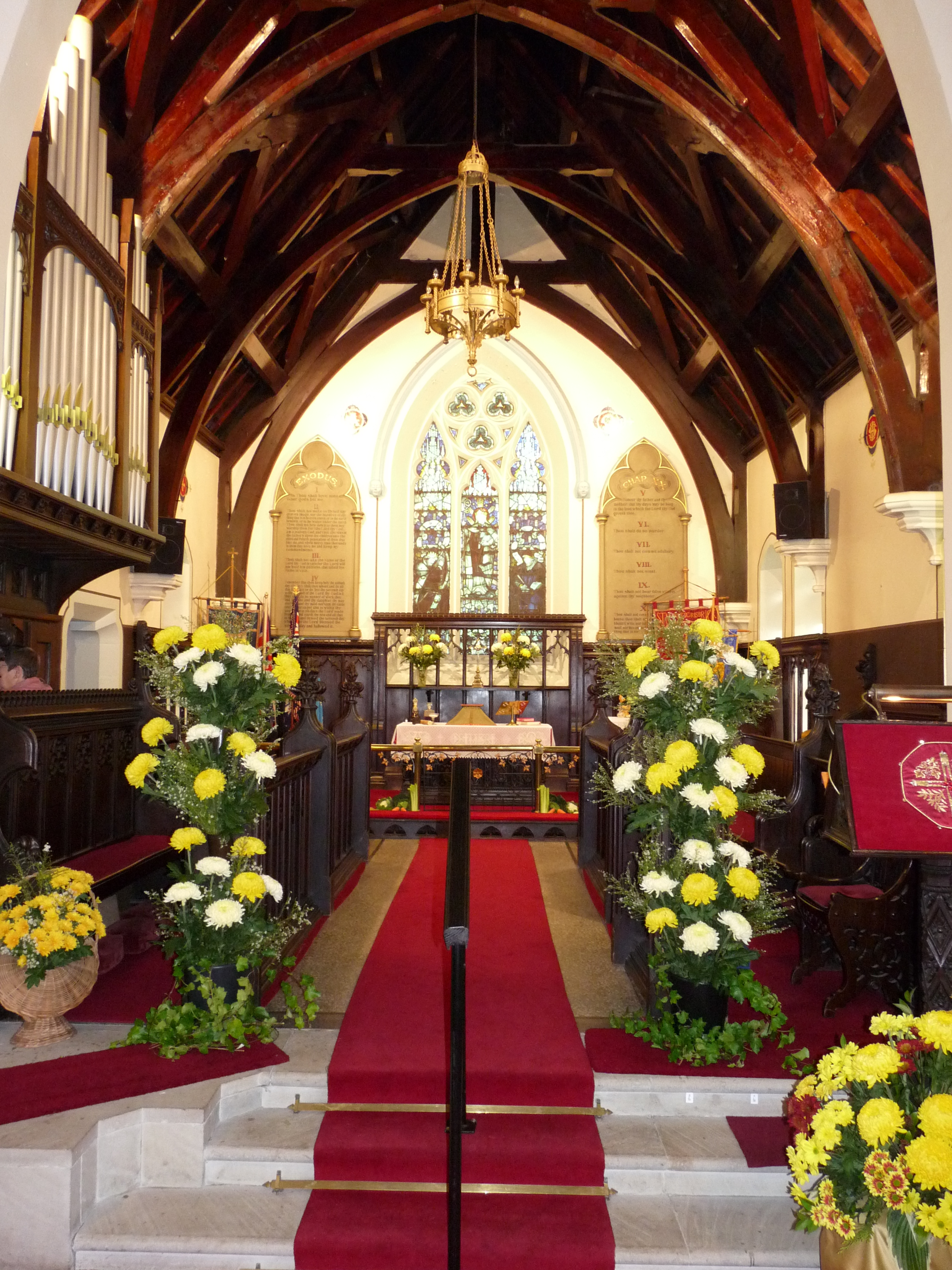
Interior of St Mark's Church, looking east down the chancel

=== Exterior ===
Located on the junction of Southport Road and Jacksmere Lane, St Mark's Church is constructed of a pale cream-grey sandstone sourced from the local quarry at Pinfold, and has a blue slate roof. The stone is rock-faced and coursed, with smooth finished dressings to the windows and doorways. Its plan consists of a nave with bellcote and two narrow paired lancet windows at the western gable end, and a lower chancel. The other windows are lancet style with buttresses in-between. The architectural style is c. 1300.

=== Interior fittings ===
A war memorial consists of two stained glass windows, each of two lights, and two associated plaques. The first window depicts Joshua and Cornelius, the second depicts Saint George and Saint Nicholas. The plaques are made of marble and commemorate 33 casualties of World War I and 11 casualties of World War II. An electronic organ was donated to the church in 1947.

== External features ==
There is a boundary wall with lychgate made of the same stone as the main building. In the churchyard are nine Commonwealth War Graves belonging to soldiers of World War I and World War II.

St Mark's parish hall, used for meetings and functions, was opened and dedicated by Bishop Flagg on 6 June 1986.

== Administration ==
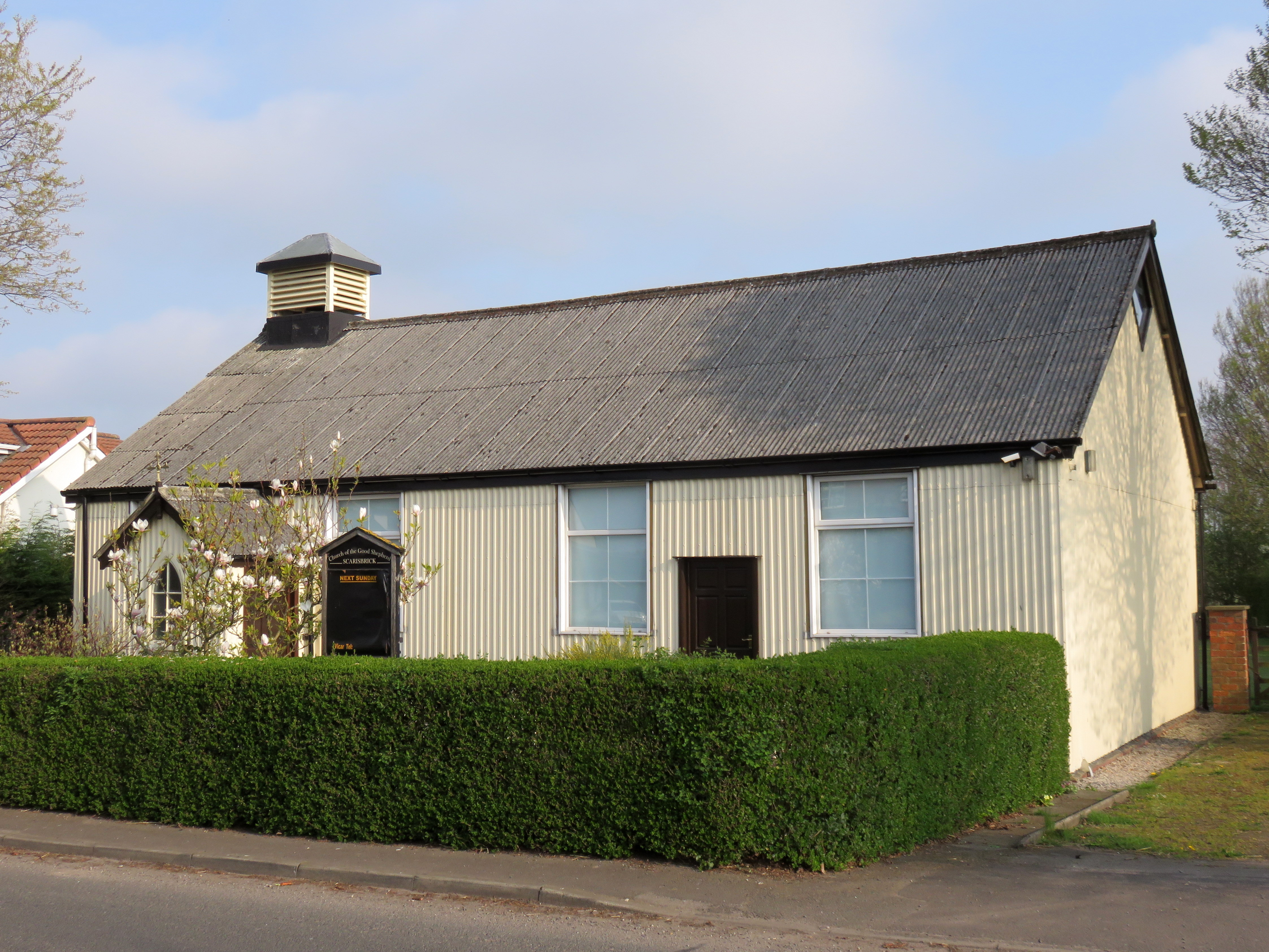
The Good Shepherd Mission on Smithy Lane

An active church in the Church of England, St Mark's is part of the diocese of Liverpool, which is in the Province of York. It is in the archdeaconry of Wigan and West Lancashire and the deanery of Ormskirk. The vicar of Ormskirk is a patron. As of December 2015 the priest in charge is the Reverend Eileen Heaney.

The parish and benefice also includes The Good Shepherd Mission, a tin chapel located on Smithy Lane.
