= Listed buildings in Scarisbrick =

Scarisbrick is a civil parish in the West Lancashire district and borough of Lancashire, England. It contains 32 buildings and structures that are recorded in the National Heritage List for England as designated listed buildings. Of these, one is listed at Grade I, the highest of the three grades, and the others are at Grade II, the lowest grade. The most significant building in the parish is Scarisbrick Hall which is listed at Grade I, with several associated structures being listed separately. The parish is a collective of smaller hamlets and is largely rural. Many of the listed buildings are houses, farmhouses or other agricultural buildings that have since been repurposed as dwellings, while the others include a telephone kiosk and the Roman Catholic Church of St Elizabeth.

== Key ==
Grade	Criteria
I	Buildings of exceptional interest, sometimes considered to be internationally important
II	Buildings of national importance and special interest

== Buildings ==
Name and location	Photograph	Date built	Description	Date listed	Entry number	Grade
Hawarden (including wheelwrights premises), Southport Road; 53.598383°N 2.925348°W		1801	A two-storey house with adjoining workshop, now a single dwelling, built of coursed square sandstone with a slate roof. The house has two bays with two windows on each floor and an arched tablet at the first floor dated 1801. To the left is the former workshop, also two storeys with two windows on each floor like the others, and a large quatrefoil roundel at the first floor. The workshop entrance below has been altered as French windows.	18 April 1973	1031787	II
Quarry House, Southport Road; 53.595803°N 2.921951°W		1794	A two-storey house built of watershot coursed sandstone with a slate roof. The house has three bays, with an ogee-arched doorway between the second and third bays, and three large square windows on each floor.	18 April 1973	1031796	II
Smithy House (on south corner of Smithy Lane), Southport Road; 53.596618°N 2.922495°W		c. 1800	A two-storey house built of coursed square sandstone with a slate roof. The house has three bays and is symmetrical, having two windows on the ground floor and three above, and a single-storey gabled porch in the centre. The north-facing wall has a single-storey Greek Revival porch, with two carved niches containing statues at the first floor.	22 June 1972	1031801	II
Hurlston Gate Farmhouse, Southport Road; 53.586106°N 2.911211°W		1769	Originally a farmhouse, now used as a house, dated 1769 at the first floor but with later alterations. It has two storeys and an attic and is built of brown brick in a Flemish bond, with sandstone plinth and quoins and a stone-coloured tile roof. The front is classical in style and has two bays, with two tall sash windows on each floor, a dentilled cornice and a slightly offset doorway with pilasters, entablature and pediment. Gable ends have chimneys and two attic windows, with an inserted window at ground level.	11 October 1968	1031803	II
Barn c. 75 metres south of New Hall Farmhouse, Southport Road; 53.623172°N 2.951414°W		1633; enlarged 1672	Built as a dower house in 1633 on the Scarisbrick Hall estate, then enlarged in 1672 and subsequently used as a barn. Made of local handmade clay brick, with a main roof supported on four oak trusses which sit on brick piers. The north side has five bays with wagon doorways between two outshuts. Each outshut has a doorway with sandstone lintel in the centre, and is flanked by small altered windows, with an additional loft window under the eaves of the left outshut. The south side and gable ends have numerous ventilation holes built into the brickwork. Converted back to a house in 2005.	2 December 1986	1031822	II
40, Hillock Lane; 53.613987°N 2.915873°W		16th century or earlier (probable)	A farmhouse dating from the 16th century or perhaps earlier, now used as a house. The building is cruck-framed with a brick chimney, rendered with some stone cladding, and has a thatched roof. There is a single storey with three bays; the present entrance is on the north side with two casement windows on either side. The interior has an inglenook fireplace, though the main point of interest is the cruck frame.	2 December 1986	1031916	II
Chestnut Cottage, 5, Pinfold Lane; 53.595845°N 2.924283°W		17th century or earlier	Originally a farmhouse, dating from the 17th century or earlier but with later alterations, now used as a house. The building is cruck-framed with rendered brick cladding and a partially thatched roof. There is a single storey with three bays, and two added bays on the west end with a projected porch. The interior is of greater interest, containing three full cruck trusses.	11 October 1968	1031923	II
1, Smithy Lane; 53.597095°N 2.922675°W		Late 18th century (probable)	A pair of cottages or perhaps a former Roman Catholic chapel, now a single dwelling. It is made from coursed squared sandstone with raised quoins, and has a slate roof. There are two storeys with two bays, and two rectangular windows with plain surrounds on each floor. In the centre are coupled doorways beneath a large tympanum, which has an archband and keystone, and above that is an oval medallion bearing a Christian cross.	18 April 1973	1031928	II
White Cottage, 23 and 25, Hall Road; 53.612620°N 2.919839°W		17th century or earlier (probable)	Originally a farmhouse, now divided into two cottages. The building is cruck-framed and has later brick cladding which is nowrendered and painted white. It has a single storey with low eaves and a rectangular plan of three and a half bays, with a staggered partition between the two dwellings. No.23 on the left has a central door and to the rear links to a modern extension; No.25 has a door on the right-hand end. Most of the windows are sashes, and the interior has four full cruck trusses.	11 October 1968	1038285	II
Diglake House, Harridge Lane; 53.588951°N 2.916963°W		c. 1770	A farmhouse built of brown brick in a Flemish bond, with a pantile roof replacing earlier stone slate tiles. The house has a square, almost symmetrical 2x2 plan, with two storeys and an attic, gable chimneys at either end, and a central doorway. Each floor has two tall windows, above which are splayed stone heads with false voussoirs and keystones. The interior contains an original staircase.	2 December 1986	1038299	II
Scarisbrick Hall; 53.606374°N 2.920801°W		1569; rebuilt and enlarged 1814–1870s	The present hall was first built in 1569 but underwent extensive rebuilding and enlargement in the 19th century, begun in 1814 by John Slater and Thomas Rickman but largely by Augustus Pugin from 1836 to 1845 and E. W. Pugin during the 1860s–70s. It is built in sandstone with stone slate roofs, all in Gothic style: the west wing of 1814 is early Gothic, the hall and other parts of the main building from 1836 to 1845 are fully developed 15th century Gothic revival, and the east wing and tower by the younger Pugin are in 15th century Flemish or French Gothic style. The interior contains elaborate carved oak of Flemish origin. Scarisbrick Hall has been a school since 1963, and as of 2015 the building is on the Heritage at Risk Register.	26 April 1963	1038565	I
Gates on drive c. 100 metres south of Scarisbrick Hall; 53.605557°N 2.920195°W		19th century (probable)	A pair of large ornamental wrought iron gates, imported by the Marquis de Castéja during the late 19th century. The gates are tall with vertical bars and some wavy patterning, and are mounted on standards which are supported on a low stone wall by large ornate brackets. Said to have been made for the Marquise de Pompadour.	25 November 1963	1073108	II
Ice house in grounds of Scarisbrick Hall; 53.607949°N 2.922178°W		c. 1800	A disused ice house made from brick, stone and earth. An egg-shaped chamber, partially underground, is approached from the north-west by a brick-vaulted passage raised above ground level with stone doorways. A second chamber on the southern side is approached from the south by separate passage at ground level, similar to the other. The building is covered by an earth mound which is heavily overgrown.	2 December 1986	1073109	II
Agricultural building in field to west of Scarisbrick Hall; 53.608394°N 2.929249°W		Late 19th century (probable)	Probably built as a feeding shelter for livestock, this building is octagonal in shape and has a cast iron frame (by W. H. Peake of Liverpool) which supports a large, umbrella-shaped tripartite roof of stone slate. It originally had open sides, perhaps with internal subdividing fences, and stood on the junction of four fields. Also known as "The Great Barn", it has been converted into a dwelling and was the winner of the West Lancashire Design Award in 2005.	2 December 1986	1073110	II
Coach house approx. 20 metres east of Asmall House, Asmall Lane; 53.575741°N 2.910340°W		18th century	Former coach house and stables built of handmade brick on a sandstone plinth, with a stone slate roof. The buildings are arranged in a U-shape, with opposed wagon doors on the north–south axis, projecting wings on the west side and outshuts on the east side; a weather vane is mounted on a stone pedestal at the centre of the ridge. The wings are gabled with two storeys, the left side having external stairs which lead to a loft door. Asmall House and its buildings have been used as a care home since 1991.	2 December 1986	1073111	II
1 and 3, Bescar Brow; 53.612756°N 2.922044°W		17th century or earlier	A pair of cottages, now a single dwelling. The building is cruck-framed, with a rear wall of stud and wattle and daub and a front wall rebuilt in brick, all rendered in plaster and painted white. There is a single storey and four bays, with a front doorway to the second bay and modern windows to the left and right; the rear has windows of various sizes. Inside are three full cruck trusses of light scantling.	11 October 1968	1073112	II
Barn c. 100 metres south west of Drummersdale Lane; 53.614983°N 2.902542°W		Late 17th century (probable)	Also known as "Box Tree Barn", this converted barn is built of handmade brick on a stone plinth, with a stone slate roof. It has a rectangular three-bay plan, with an added fourth bay on the south gable. There are two opposing wagon entrances, full-height on the east side and half-height on the west side, and a doorway on the north gable. Inside are two original collar trusses.	2 December 1986	1073113	II
Whitefield House, Drummersdale Lane; 53.606869°N 2.899447°W		1752	A farmhouse built of handmade brick, now rendered and painted white, with a stone slate roof. There are two storeys with three bays (originally just two), and a projecting gabled porch which is dated 1752 above a front doorway. The earlier part of the house has a chimney in front of the ridge on each gable wall, the added bay has a third chimney on the end gable and a doorway to the rear. All of the windows are sliding sashes.	2 December 1986	1073114	II
Gorsuch Hall, Gorsuch Lane; 53.600309°N 2.940220°W		19th century	A farmhouse built of handmade brick in a Flemish bond, on a sandstone plinth and with sandstone dressings. The farmhouse replaced an earlier hall destroyed by fire in 1816, of which nothing remains.	11 October 1968	1073115	II
Roman Catholic Church of St Elizabeth, Hall Road; 53.612322°N 2.920942°W		1888	The church was designed by Pugin & Pugin in Decorated style, and is built of red sandstone with a red slate roof. The interior fittings include an elaborately carved Belgian pulpit dating from the mid to late 17th century.	2 December 1986	1073116	II
Ormershaws Farmhouse, Harridge Lane; 53.590305°N 2.922430°W		Early 19th century (probable)	A two-storey farmhouse, dated 1905 but probably earlier. It is built from large, squared sandstone blocks, with a stone slate roof, brick chimneys and a red brick extension on the west side. There are two bays with sash windows on each floor, each with stone sills and heads. A gabled porch in the centre has an outer doorway with moulded surround, hood mould, and studded door, above which is a small arched window. The single-bay brick extension has two lower storeys with windows on each floor, and a small mid-level window near the junction.	2 December 1986	1073117	II
Hill Farmhouse, 54, Moorfield Lane; 53.593783°N 2.906880°W		1650	Originally a farmhouse, now used as a house. It is built of coursed squared sandstone with quoins and a stone slate roof, and has a T-shaped plan with two storeys. A two-bay wing on the east–west axis is the earlier part; the gable has a recessed three-light casement window on each floor, and is dated 1650 near the apex. The single-bay main range on the north side has a front doorway and horizontal windows similar to those on the wing, with a gable chimney and to the rear a single-storey extension.	11 October 1968	1073118	II
Quarry Farmhouse, 6 and 7, Pinfold Lane; 53.595493°N 2.924887°W		1807	A farmhouse with adjoining cottage, each with two storeys and built of coursed squared sandstone with a stone slate roof. The farmhouse on the right has two bays with an offset left-of-centre doorway and two windows on each floor, while the single-bay cottage has a doorway on the left end and a window on each floor; all windows are sashes with stone sills and heads. The junction has a quatrefoil at the first floor (dated 1807) and a multiple-flue chimney, with another chimney on the right-hand gable.	18 April 1973	1073119	II
551 and 553, Southport Road; 53.609829°N 2.933752°W		Early 18th century	A house, now divided into two dwellings, built of handmade brick with stone dressings and stone slate roof. It has a double-depth two-bay plan with projecting porch, and is symmetrical with three storeys. Each floor has two casement windows, the topmost shorter, with stone surrounds and keystones. Central porch has two storeys with a window at the first floor, above which is a restoration date of 1809. The gable ends have extruded chimney stacks.	11 October 1968	1073120	II
Pinfold Cottage, Southport Road; 53.596974°N 2.923451°W		1809	A house, probably brick but now rendered and colour washed, with raised quoins and a slate roof. It has a double-depth two-bay plan with two storeys, and an added rear wing. The front door is slightly offset left of centre and has a pedimented architrave; each floor has two casement windows with surrounds matching the quoins. At the first floor above the door is a quatrefoil dated 1809. The gable ends each have chimneys, with four flues on the left side and two flues on the right.	18 April 1973	1073121	II
Stable buildings around east side of courtyard to east of Scarisbrick Hall; 53.606517°N 2.919803°W		c. 1840 – 1860s	Stable buildings and screen wall in Flemish or French Gothic style, partly c. 1840 by Augustus Pugin and partly 1860s by E. W. Pugin; built in red brick with sandstone dressings and steep pitched roofs of stone slate. The buildings are arranged in an L-shape; on the south side is a large gatehouse, embattled screen wall and corner tower; on the east side a returned wall with arched gateway (now blocked) and another gatehouse. The south gatehouse is square and in two stages, the upper part standing within the battlements of the lower, with round turrets at the corners and a tall triangular turret at the centre. The corner tower is circular with an octagonal upper stage and roof.	26 April 1963	1073129	II
K6 telephone kiosk at junction with Southport Road, Smithy Lane; 53.596804°N 2.922575°W		1935	Type K6 red telephone box, designed by Sir Giles Gilbert Scott in 1935. Cast iron square kiosk with domed rook, crowns to top panels and margin glazing to door and windows.	27 July 1988	1260805	II
North lodge to Scarisbrick Hall with gatepiers and walling 53.608882°N 2.915952°W		c. 1840 (probable)	Tudor style gate lodge, now divided into two dwellings, with associated gatepiers and walling. The lodge is built in squared sandstone with quoins, and has a low-pitched roof concealed by an embattled parapet. There are three bays with two storeys, each floor having three windows with two doors arranged between those on the ground floor, all arched with hood moulds. At the first floor above the doors are two stone shields, one blank, the other carved with a coat of arms. Gatepiers are approximately 3 metres (10 ft) high, square with chamfered corners and octagonal caps.	11 October 1968	1361858	II
Heaton Bridge Villa, 20 and 22, Heatons Bridge Road; 53.599031°N 2.901641°W		1749	Originally a farmhouse, now divided into two dwellings, built of handmade brick in a Flemish bond on a stone plinth, with stone quoins and a stone slate roof. It has a double-depth two-bay plan with two storeys and an attic. A doorway is at the left end and has a splayed brick head with keystone; each floor has two square windows with similar brick heads and triple keystones. Between the upper windows is a datestone inscribed "HH RH 1749".	19 March 1984	1361859	II
Barn on north side of road c. 20 metres west of number 15, Smithy Lane; 53.596780°N 2.922006°W		1796	A converted barn built of coursed squared sandstone with quoins and a stone slate roof. It has a rectangular three-bay plan, and in the centre is a wagon doorway with keystone dated 1796. The right-hand bay has a square window at the first floor and a rectangular window at the ground floor, with a blocked doorway at the end.	18 April 1973	1361860	II
Old Vicarage, Southport Road; 53.597560°N 2.924941°W		Early 19th century	A house built of red brick in a Flemish bond, with stone quoins and dressings. It has a square 3x3 plan with a rear service wing, and has two storeys which are symmetrical. The middle bay is slightly set back and has a double doorway with moulded stone architrave, and at the first floor is a sixteen-light sash window; the outer bays have similar windows at each floor. Each gable has other sash windows and two chimneys, between which the wall carries up to make a parapet. Some ex situ mahogany paneling is believed to have come from Knowsley Hall library which was demolished c. 1948.	18 April 1973	1361861	II
Mill House, Southport Road; 53.593669°N 2.921644°W		1804	A two-storey house, originally with two bays and built in coursed squared sandstone, with an added third bay on the left built in brick. The earlier part has a round-headed doorway positioned left-of-centre, and at the first floor above is a raised quatrefoil dated 1804. Each floor has two windows with sills and splayed stone heads, all fitted with modern casements. The added bay has similar windows on each floor and a gable chimney, but is of less interest.	2 December 1986	1361862	II

== See also ==
- St Mark's Church, Scarisbrick
- Listed buildings in Lancashire
