= Drummersdale =

Hamlet in Lancashire, England

Coordinates: 53.610°N 2.916°W

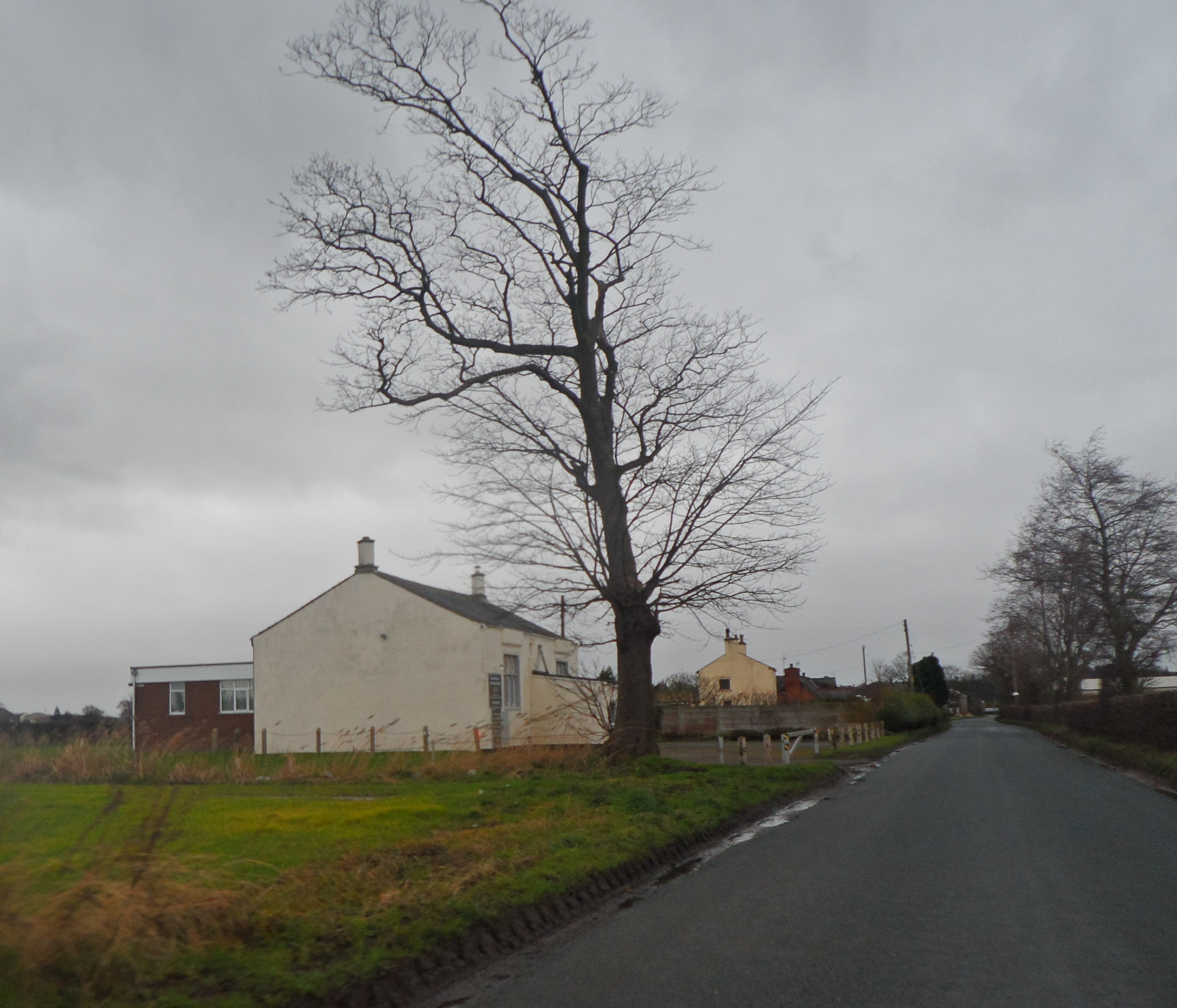
- Drummersdale Mission Church

- Location in West Lancashire Location within Lancashire
- OS grid reference: SD394129
- Civil parish: Scarisbrick
- District: West Lancashire
- Shire county: Lancashire
- Region: North West
- Country: England
- Sovereign state: United Kingdom
- Post town: ORMSKIRK
- Postcode district: L40
- Dialling code: 01704
- Police: Lancashire
- Fire: Lancashire
- Ambulance: North West
- UK Parliament: West Lancashire

Drummersdale is a hamlet in the civil parish of Scarisbrick, West Lancashire, England.

== Toponymy ==
The toponymy is doubtful, although the final element of the name is certainly either Old English dæl "dale, valley" or the cognate Old Norse dalr, as in Rochdale. The name was recorded as Drimersdele in 1152.

== Transport ==
Drummersdale lies on the B5242 road and is near Bescar Lane railway station on the Manchester to Southport line.
