= Thomas Grieve (painter) =

English painter

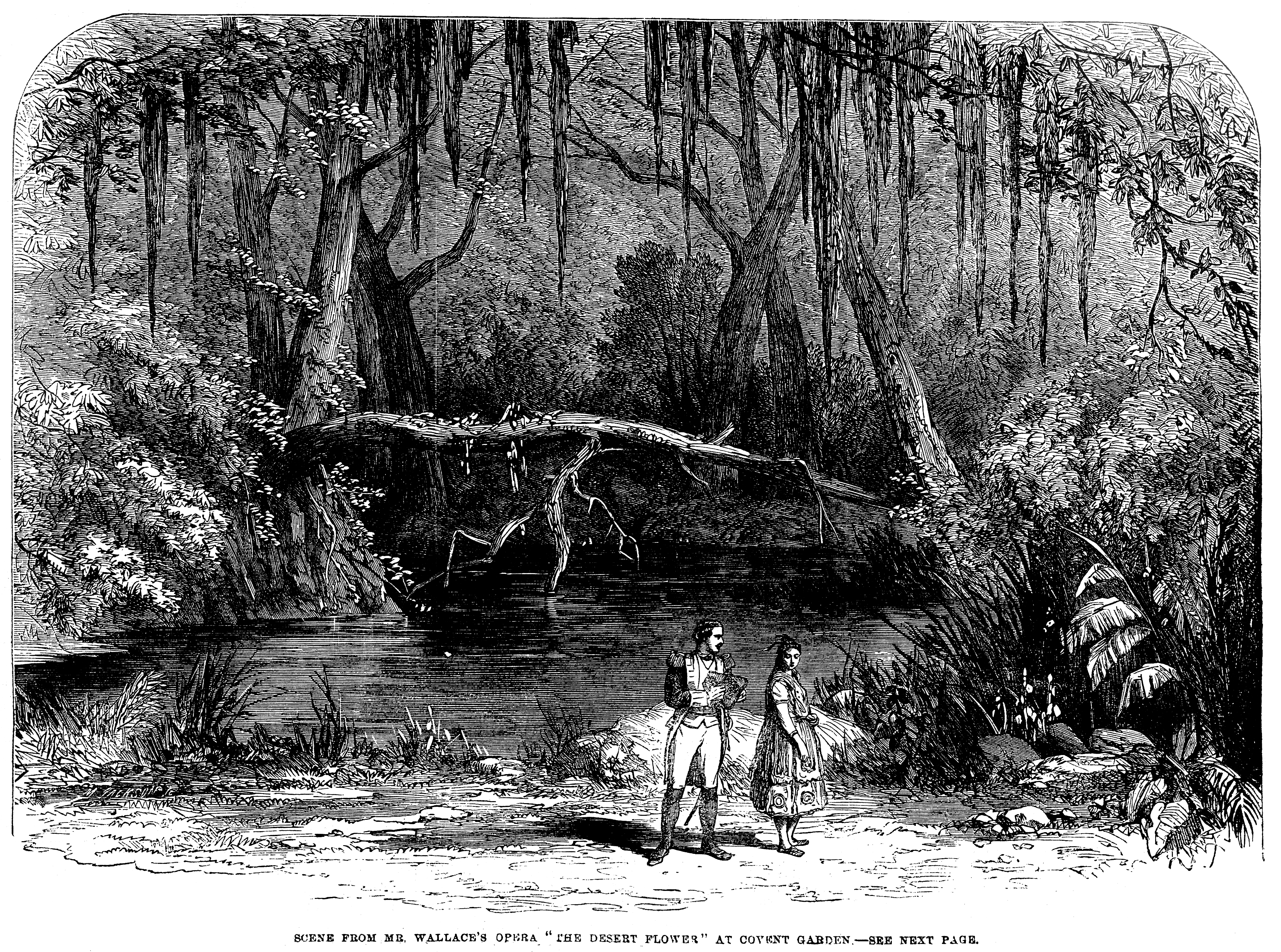
An engraving from a sketch by Grieve of his set for The Desert Flower staged at Covent Garden in 1863

Thomas Grieve (1799–1882) was an English scene-painter.

== Life ==
Grieve, son of John Henderson Grieve, theatrical scene-painter (1770–1845), was born at Lambeth, London, 11 June 1799, and was a member of a family long associated with Covent Garden as the chief artists employed in the adornment of the dramas, spectacles, and pantomimes brought out under the management of the Kembles and Laporte. When Mr. and Mrs. Charles Mathews became lessees of Covent Garden Theatre in 1839, Thomas Grieve was chosen as the principal scenic artist, and he painted the effective panoramas introduced into their Christmas pantomimes.

His services were afterwards transferred to Drury Lane, and in December 1862 he was the artist who pictorially illustrated the famous annual of Goody Two Shoes, The diorama of The Overland Mail at the Royal Gallery of Illustration in 1850, and many illustrations of a similar kind were much indebted for their success to his artistic aid. In conjunction with William Telbin (1812–1873) and John Absolon he produced the panorama of the Campaigns of Wellington in 1852, and subsequently other panoramas of the Ocean Mail, the Crimean War, and the Arctic Regions.

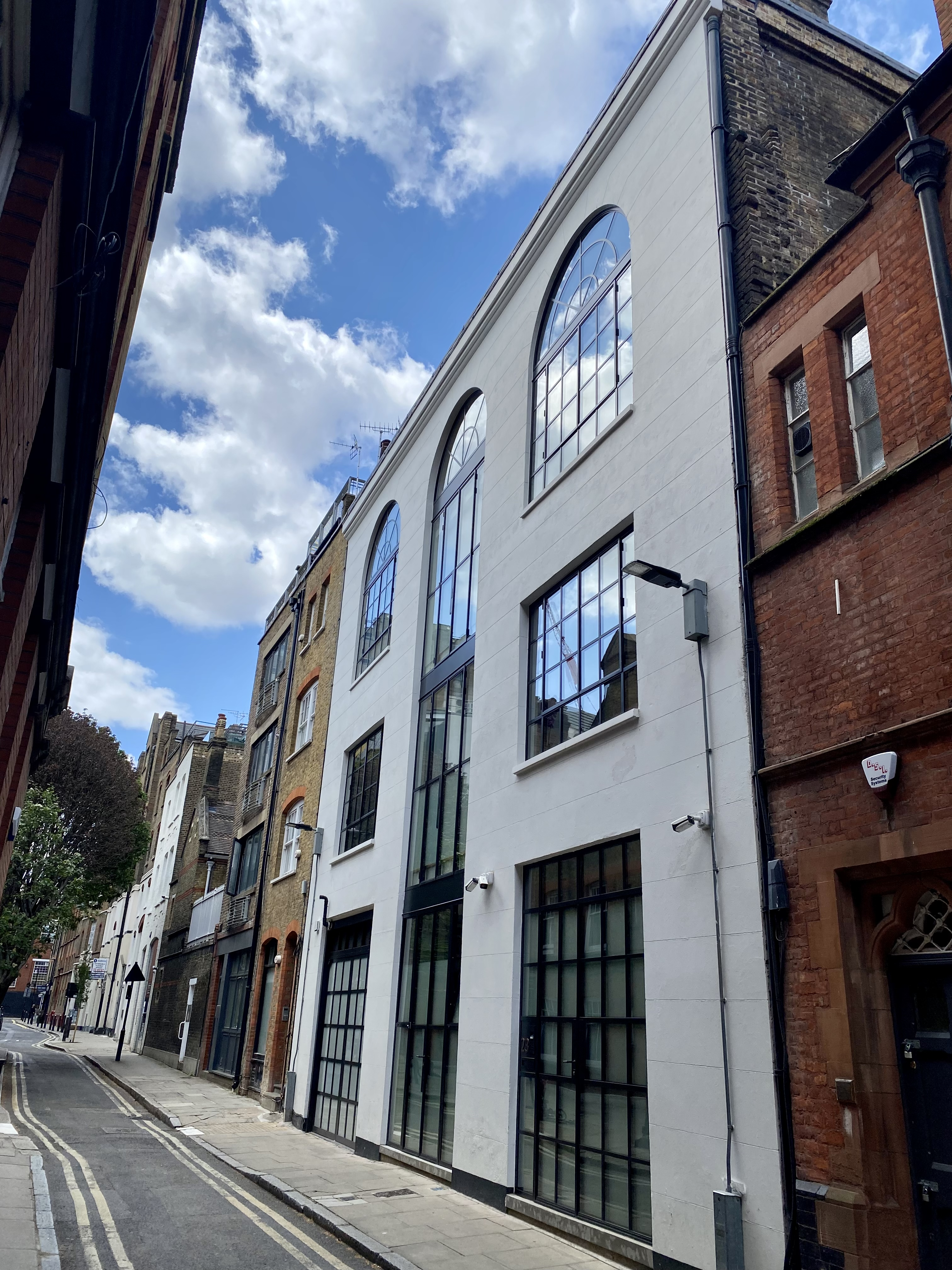
Grieve and Son's workshop in Macklin Street, Covent Garden

Macklin's scene painting company was based at 23 Macklin Street (formerly 36 Charles Street) in Covent Garden. The building was specifically designed with a winch so the large theatrical backdrops could be worked on. It is the oldest surviving purpose built scene painting space designed outside of a theatre.

In partnership with his son, Tom Walford Grieve, he continued to labour for many years, and the announcement that the scenery for any piece was by Grieve and Son was a sufficient guarantee to the public of the excellence of the work. In the brilliancy of his style, the appearance of reality, and the artistic beauty of his landscape compositions, he has seldom been excelled. He worked on until his death at 1 Palace Road, Lambeth (since known as 47 Lambeth Palace Road), 16 April 1882. He was buried in West Norwood Cemetery on 20 April.

He married Elizabeth, daughter of Robert Goatley of Newbury, by whom he had two children, Tom Walford Grieve, born 15 October 1841, a well-known scene-painter, and Fanny Elizabeth Grieve. His brother, William Grieve, was also a scene-painter.
