= William Grieve (painter) =

English painter

- Born: 1800; London
- Died: 12 November 1844 (aged 43–44); South Lambeth
- Occupation: Painter

William Grieve (1800 – 12 November 1844) was an English scene-painter.

== Biography ==
Grieve was one of a family connected for several generations with this branch of art, son of John Henderson Grieve, a scene-painter of repute, was born in London in 1800. He was employed as a boy at Covent Garden Theatre, but subsequently gained his chief celebrity as a scene-painter for Drury Lane Theatre and Her Majesty's opera-house. When Clarkson Stanfield and David Roberts abandoned scene-painting, Grieve was left at the head of the profession. His moonlight scenes were especially notable, and in 1832, after a performance of ‘Robert le Diable,’ the audience called him before the curtain, then an unprecedented occurrence. Grieve also attained some success in small pictures and water-colours. He died at South Lambeth on 12 November 1844, leaving a wife and five children. His younger brother, Thomas Grieve, was also a scene-painter.
