= Greaves Hall =

Greaves Hall Hospital
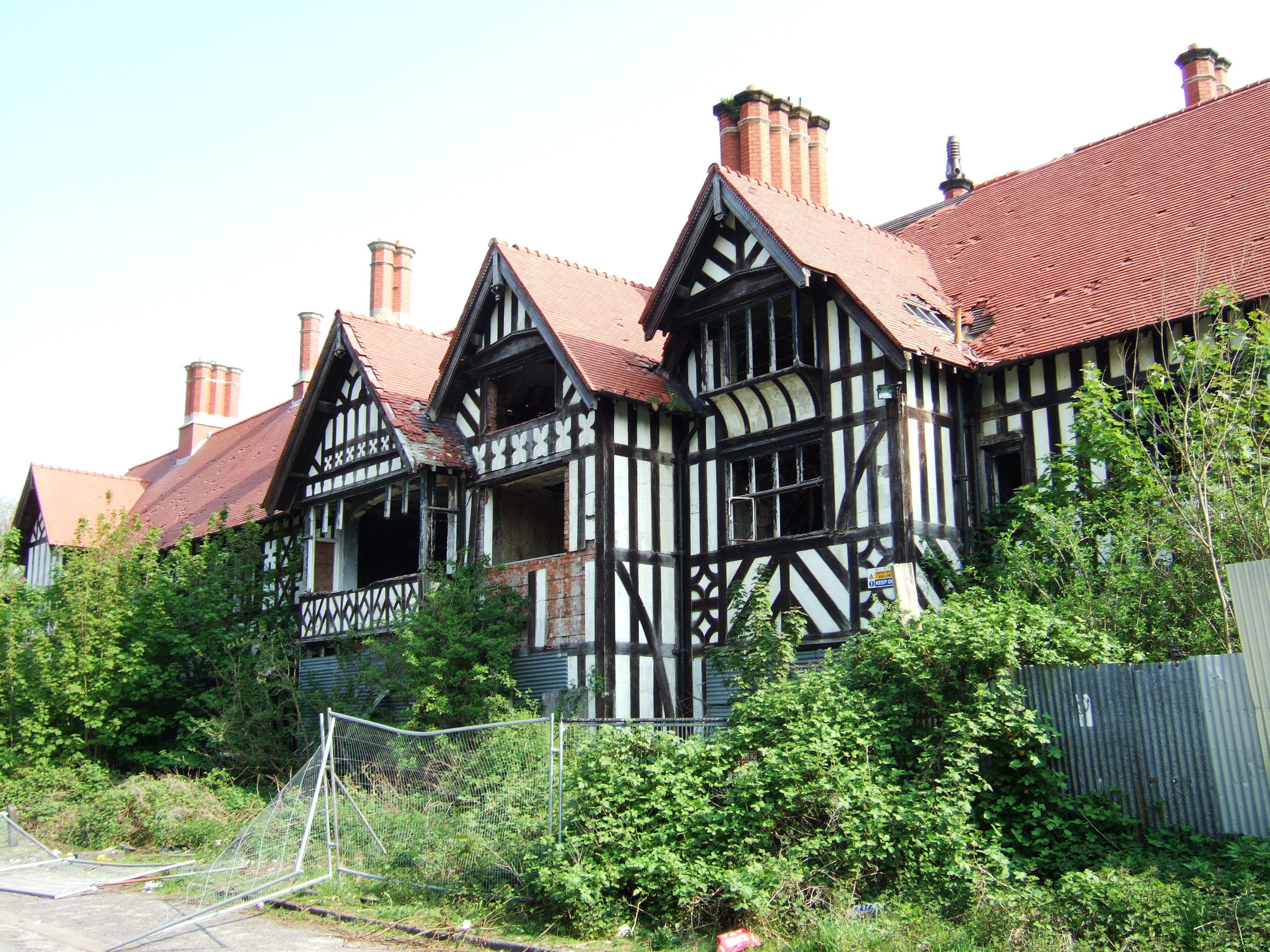
- Greaves Hall

- Former location in West Lancashire

Geography
- Location: Banks, North Meols, Lancashire, England, United Kingdom
- Coordinates: 53.6756°N 2.9159°W

Organisation
- Care system: Was private, NHS,
- Type: Teaching, psychiatric,

History
- Founded: 1948
- Closed: 1992
- Demolished: 2009

Links
- Lists: Hospitals in England

Greaves Hall was a country house on the outskirts of Banks in Lancashire, England, built in a Tudorbethan style for Thomas Talbot Leyland Scarisbrick in 1900. It was demolished in 2009, after falling into disrepair.

== History ==
Thomas Scarisbrick born in 1874, built Greaves Hall in 1900 on a 124-acre (0.50 km2) site given by his father as a wedding present when he married Josephine Chamberlain of Cleveland, Ohio, USA in 1895. The mansion was surrounded by sculptured lawns, gardens with ornamental trees and flowering shrubs. The hall had approximately 55 rooms, open areas situated on the ground, first, second and attic floors and a vast basement. A porter's lodge by the main entrance, a gardener's lodge, engineer's workshop, laundry and general workshop in mock Tudor style were built in close proximity.

The Scarisbricks remained at Greaves Hall until after the First World War when they moved to Scarisbrick Hall and sold the estate to a consortium of farmers from Banks. The mansion stood empty while the land was cultivated by the consortium. On 3 May 1932 the house was leased to Dorothy Glaister Greaves and became Sherbrook Private Girls' School. The ballroom was used as the school hall, with dormitories in the attic rooms, the library was re-stocked. The gardens were used for sports and leisure with tennis courts and hockey pitches. The house and grounds were used by the school until 1938 when it closed.

== Greaves Hall Hospital ==
After the school closed, the house was used as a hospital for patients with tuberculosis. In 1948, it was used for patients from Liverpool with mental health problems. The mental health unit had wards and ancillary buildings in the leisure grounds of the old house. The hospital closed in the early 1990s when services were moved to Southport.

== Dereliction ==
The hall suffered from acts of vandalism and arson after it closed and its owners claimed it was beyond repair. Applications were made to demolish the building, and other buildings including the landmark water tower. Despite having Listed building status Greaves Hall suffered arson attacks which led to its partial demolition in 2003 and 2005. The building was removed from the heritage at risk register in 2009 and demolished shortly afterwards, having become structurally unsafe. Demolition took two months due to the grand scale of the building.

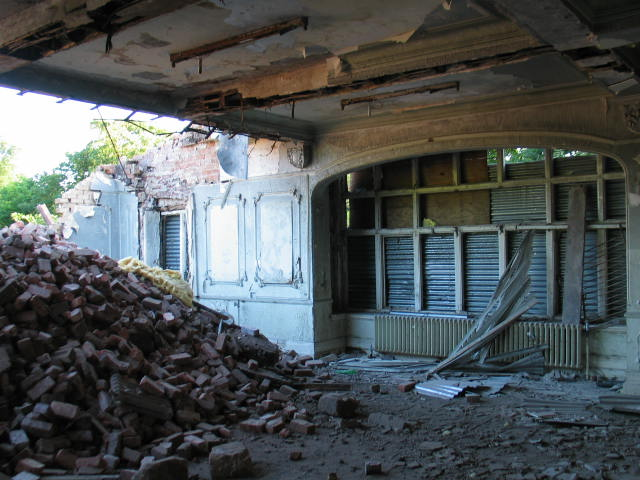
Greaves Hall dining room during demolition (20/08/2009)

== Development ==
Redrow homes have developed most of the site where the hospital wards once stood. The old hospital school was converted into a new school for St Stephen's Primary. The former communal hall at the centre of hospital activities was converted into Banks Leisure Centre retaining the gymnasium, stage and function hall. The swimming pool was filled in and replaced by football/tennis/basketball courts. The nurses' houses are privately owned. The recreational ground and golf driving range are used for football and archery. In 2009 a development of houses was built next to the old nurses' homes. A small business park has been developed in ancillary buildings south of the water tower, which is known as Greaves Hall Industrial Estate. The hospital water tower was demolished in late 2018 and early 2019. The remains of the maintenance buildings were demolished in late 2010.

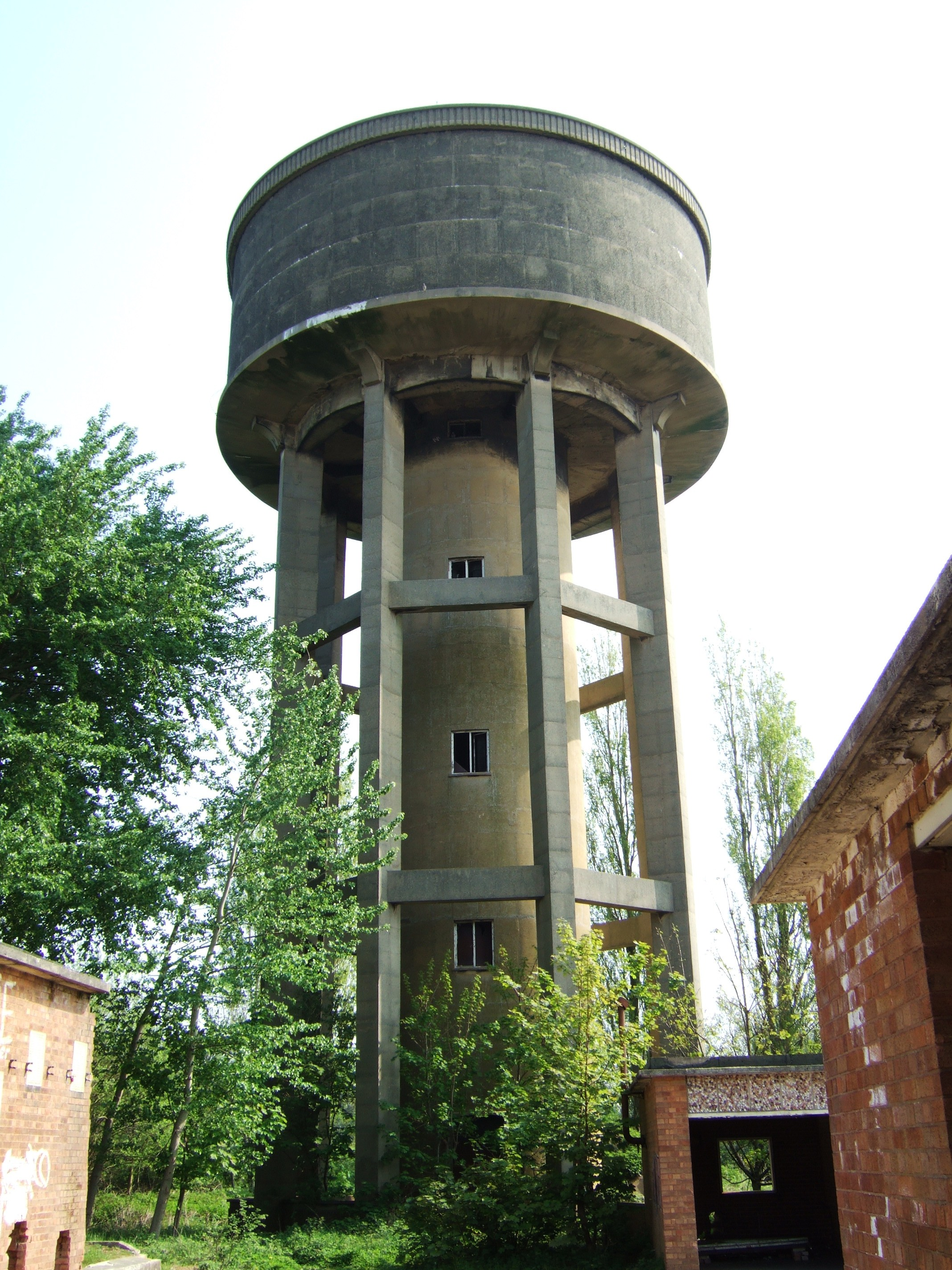
Greaves Hall Water Tower

In late 2013 development began on the wasteland site behind The Close for the construction of an elderly care facility called Sutton Grange.

=== Future ===
There have been proposals for the re-generation of the site. Part of the site has been designated for employment. More shops and businesses are needed in the village and Greaves Hall has been identified as a prime location. This will also incorporate the "Greaves Hall Industrial Estate" into the employment plan. The playing field is designated as green space along with the wood and cannot be developed.
