= Scarisbrick =

Village in Lancashire, England

Coordinates: 53.610°N 2.934°W

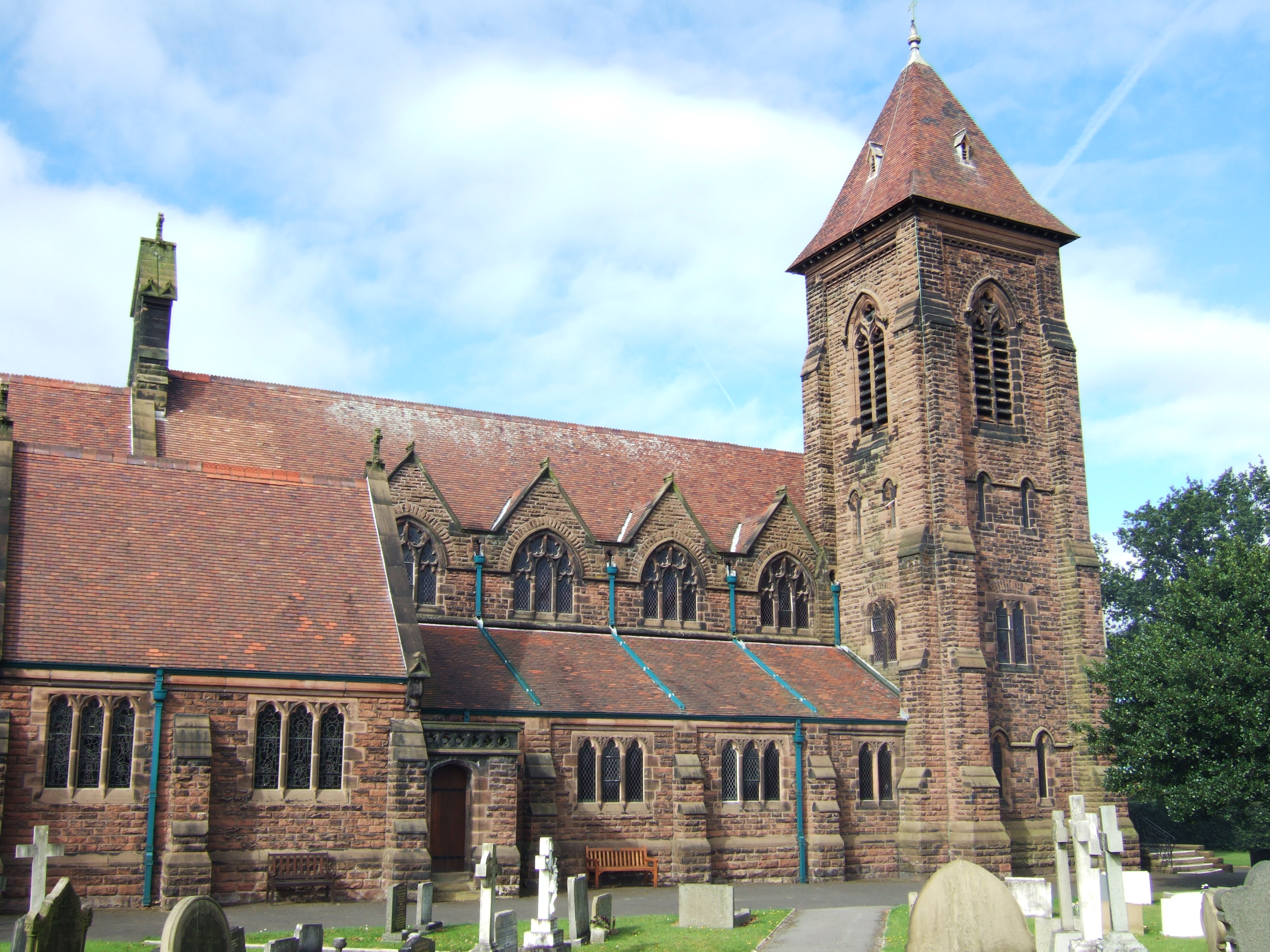
- St Elizabeth's Church

- Location in West Lancashire Location within Lancashire
- Population: 3,554 (2011 Census)
- OS grid reference: SD382130
- Civil parish: Scarisbrick
- District: West Lancashire
- Shire county: Lancashire
- Region: North West
- Country: England
- Sovereign state: United Kingdom
- Post town: ORMSKIRK
- Postcode district: L40
- Post town: SOUTHPORT
- Postcode district: PR8, PR9
- Dialling code: 01704
- Police: Lancashire
- Fire: Lancashire
- Ambulance: North West
- UK Parliament: West Lancashire

Scarisbrick (/ˈskeɪzbrɪk, ˈskɛərz-/) is a village and civil parish in West Lancashire, England. The A570, the main road between Ormskirk and Southport, runs through Scarisbrick, and much of the village lies along it. As a result, it does not have a traditional village centre, though the junction with the A5147 is close to the geographic centre.

== Toponymy ==
Scarisbrick literally means "Skar's slope" and comes from the Old Norse Skar (a personal name) + -es (possessive) + brekka ("slope"). It is thought that the personal name is Danish, though the second element suggests Norwegian settlement. The "slope" may refer to a slight incline between two streams near the site of Scarisbrick Hall. The name was recorded as Scharisbrec c.1200, Skaresbrek in 1238, and finally Scarisbrick c.1240.

== History ==
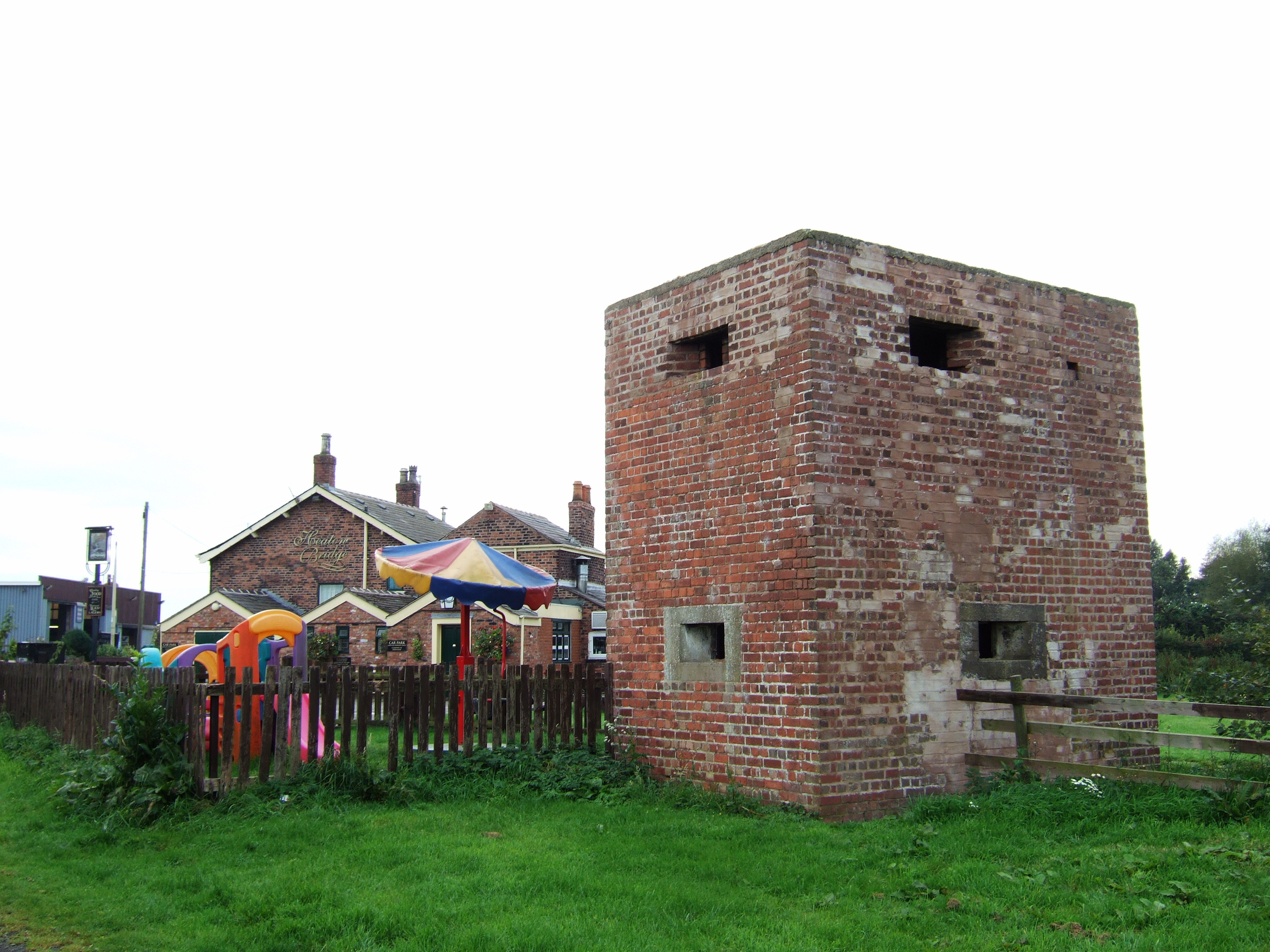
World War II pillbox at Heatons Bridge.

In its early history, travellers tended to avoid Scarisbrick parish. Martin Mere, a large lake with associated marshlands and peat bogs, made the immediate area quite difficult to cross. Much of the flat land between Southport and Liverpool is polder reclaimed from marshes and the lake. The modern-day hamlets of Barrison Green, Bescar, Carr Cross, Drummersdale, Hurlston, Pinfold, and Snape Green were formed from the early farms and settlements that did arise in the area.

Scarisbrick still contains many structures and artefacts from its past. The Old School House, constructed in 1809, has served several roles in its history and now contains two residences. A pillbox constructed during World War II can be found near a bridge over the Leeds and Liverpool Canal. It was from Pinfold, where the canal is closest to Southport, that William Sutton picked up waterway passengers for transport to his "Original Hotel", known better as "Duke's Folly" - the foundation of Southport. The canal now is used for recreational purposes. The only Catholic church there, St Elizabeth's, was founded by the Marquis of Casteja and was named after his wife. There are many other churches there as well.

"Wheelwrights House", a former workshop located on Southport Road, is another of the many listed buildings in Scarisbrick.

== Demography ==
According to the United Kingdom Census 2011, Scarisbrick parish had a population of 3,554 people living in 1,505 households, with an almost even distribution between males and females. The parish covers an area of 3,207 hectares (12.38 sq mi; 32.07 km^{2}), giving a population density of 1.1 inhabitants per hectare (280/sq mi; 110/km^{2}). The increase in population from 3,204 in 2001 represents a growth rate of 10.9% over ten years.

A majority of 97.2% of residents were born in the United Kingdom, and 96.8% identified as being of "White British" ethnicity. Religion was recorded as 78.5% Christian, with 14.5% of residents being of no religion, and 6.1% declining to state; only 0.9% belonged to an alternative religion. Of the 2,695 residents aged between 16 and 74, 67.7% were regarded as economically active, and of those 4.7% were unemployed.

== Transport ==
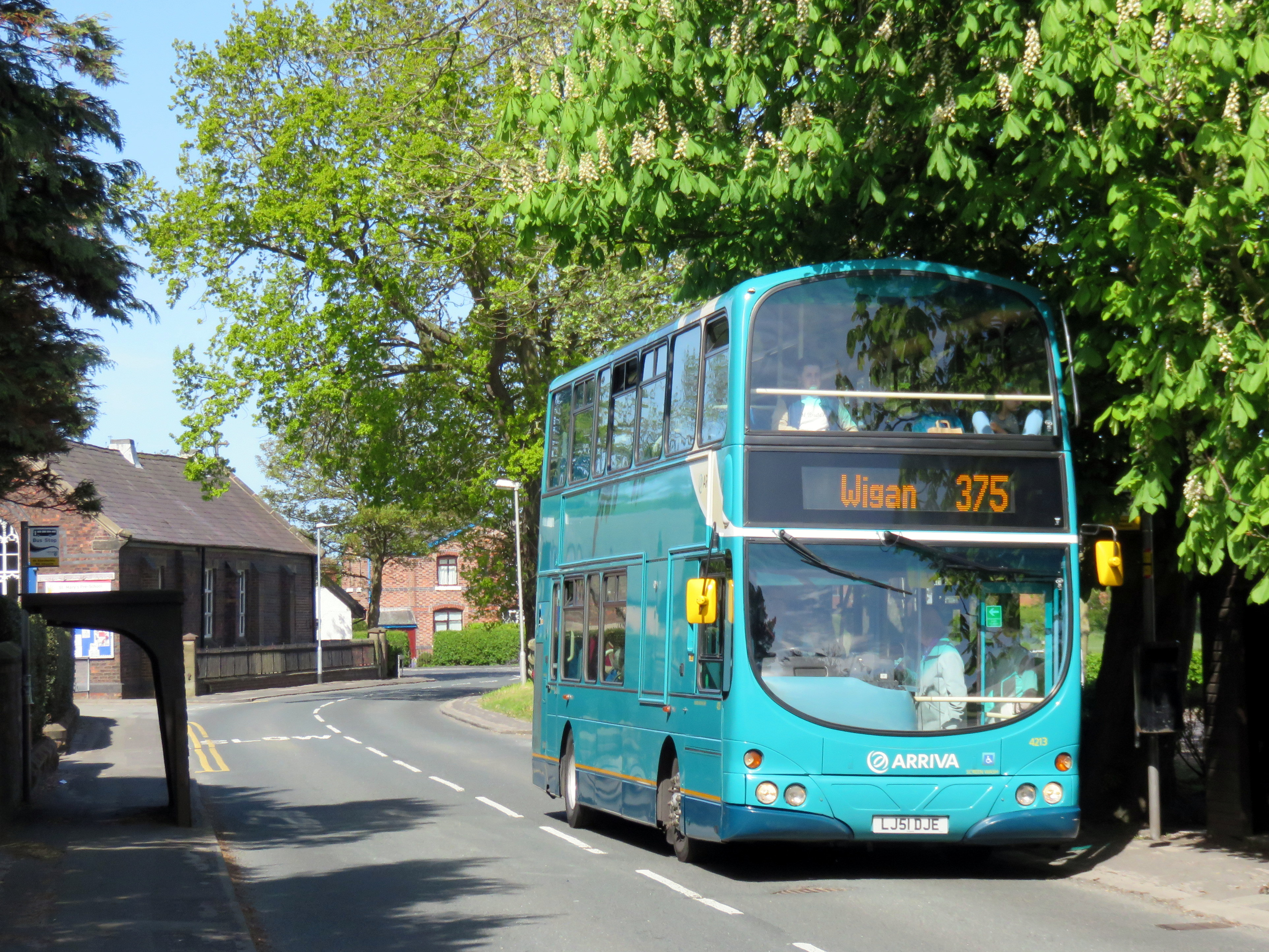
375 bus service from Southport to Wigan, operated by Arriva North West

Scarisbrick is on the A570 road, which runs northwest through it between Ormskirk and Southport for 4.7 miles (7.6 km). The A5147 road, which runs north from Maghull through Halsall, terminates at its junction with the A570 at Scarisbrick. There are also two B roads, the B5242 which leads towards Burscough, and the B5243 which provides an alternative route into Southport. The nearest motorway links are junction 3 of the M58, 4.4 miles (7.1 km) to the southeast at Bickerstaffe, and junction 27 of the M6, 7.9 miles (12.7 km) east at Wrightington.

Arriva North West operate several bus services in Scarisbrick. The 385 and 375 are 3 buses per hour combined (every 40 minutes each to create a combined every 20 minutes frequency [from 1st September]) services from Southport to Wigan which both follow similar routes; the 385 crosses Scarisbrick directly along the A570, while the 375 takes a diversion along the B5242 through the more rural parts of the parish, before rejoining the A570 at Ormskirk. The half-hourly 300 service from Southport to Liverpool also passes through Scarisbrick.

Bescar Lane railway station, which opened in 1855, is managed by Northern Trains on the Manchester to Southport Line. As of May 2015, trains generally operate eight times a day Monday–Saturday in each direction, travelling westbound to Southport (12–15 minutes) and eastbound to Manchester Oxford Road via Wigan Wallgate (65–70 minutes). There are no train services at Bescar Lane on Sundays. During the 2013–14 financial year, the station was used by an estimated 3,146 passengers.

Heathey Lane Halt, a station on the Barton branch of the Lancashire & Yorkshire Railway, was on the boundary between Scarisbrick and Halsall, just to the north of the B5243 road bridge. The station was in operation between 1907 and 1938, and the line itself closed in 1952.

== Notable people ==
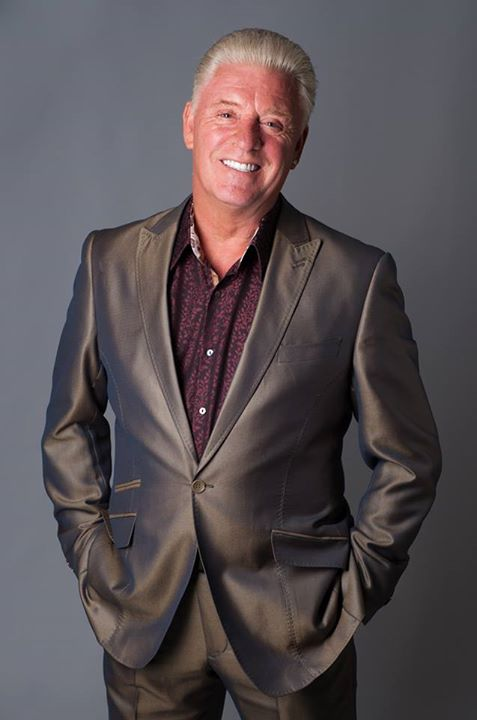
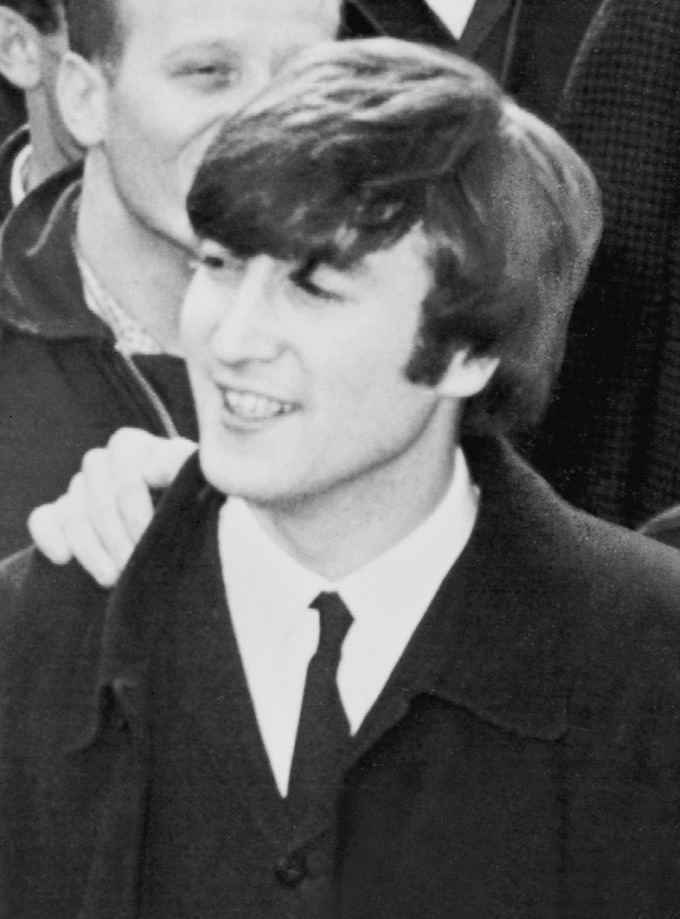
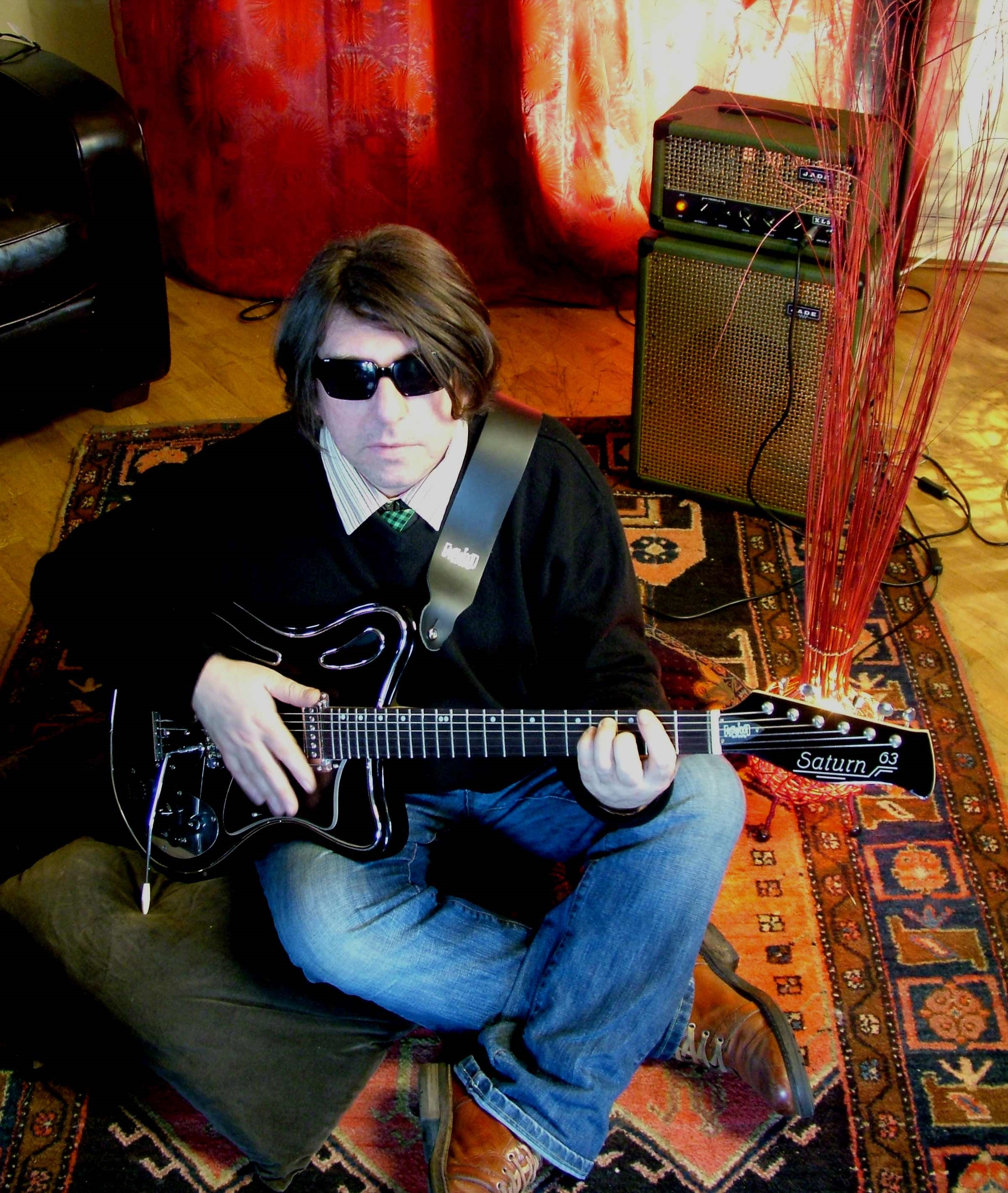
From left to right: Derek Acorah; John Lennon; Will Sergeant
- Derek Acorah (1950–2020), spirit medium and television personality known for his work on the series Most Haunted, lived in Scarisbrick.
- Michael Hastings, Baron Hastings of Scarisbrick, CBE (born 1958), life peer educated at Scarisbrick Hall School.
- John Lennon (1940–1980), singer-songwriter and co-founder of the Beatles, employed as a labourer at Mill Brow waterworks in 1959.
- Johnny Mitchell (born 1971), former professional American football player, coaches American sports at Scarisbrick Hall School.
- Samuel Nevill (1837–1921), first Bishop of Dunedin in New Zealand and former curate of Scarisbrick.
- St John Plessington (c.1637–1679), priest educated at Scarisbrick Hall, canonised as one of the Forty Martyrs of England and Wales in 1970.
- Will Sergeant (born 1958), musician and guitarist with Echo & the Bunnymen, lives in Scarisbrick.
- James Valiant (1884–1917), cricketer formerly of the Morris Dancers public house, died of wounds during World War I.

== See also ==
- Scarisbrick Hall
- Scarisbrick Hall School
- St Mark's Church, Scarisbrick
- Listed buildings in Scarisbrick
- Aspinwall (surname)
