= Thomas Scarisbrick =

Sir Thomas Scarisbrick

Sir Tom Talbot Leyland Scarisbrick, 1st Baronet (28 April 1874 – 18 May 1933) was a British Liberal Party politician.

He was Liberal Member of Parliament for South Dorset from 1906 to 1910, mayor of Southport 1902–1903, and JP Lancashire 1st Baronet of Greaves Hall.

Sir Talbot Scarisbrick was the elder son of Sir Charles Scarisbrick [Kt 1903; JP; late Mayor of Southport; born 20 April 1839 died 15 January 1923; m 1860, Bertha Petronella (d 1915), d of Ernst Marquard Schonfeld, of Hanau-on-Main and Düsseldorf; one s two d. Address: Scarisbrick Lodge, Southport, Lancs.]; m 1895, Josephine, daughter of W. S. Chamberlain of Cleveland, Ohio; Succeeded by his son, Everard Talbot Scarisbrick [b 10 Dec. 1896; died 29 August 1955; m 1919, Nadine, d of Charles Brumm, Manchester]. Address: Scarisbrick Hall, Lancashire. Motor Car Registration Number: LO 8321, LL 6374, LP 5397.

== Arms ==
Coat of arms of Thomas Scarisbrick

Crest
Between two trefoils slipped Vert a falcon close Proper belled and jessed and charged on the breast with a mullet of six points Or.
Escutcheon
Argent a saltire engrailed parted and fretty between two mullets of six points in pale all Sable.
Motto
Patentia Vincit Omnia

Parliament of the United Kingdom
Preceded by William Brymer	Member of Parliament for South Dorset; 1906 – January 1910	Succeeded by Angus Hambro
Baronetage of the United Kingdom
New creation	Baronet (of Greaves Hall); 1909–1933	Succeeded by Sir Everard Scarisbrick
