= Scarisbrick Hall =

Grade I listed English country house in the United Kingdom

Coordinates: 53.6065°N 2.9210°W

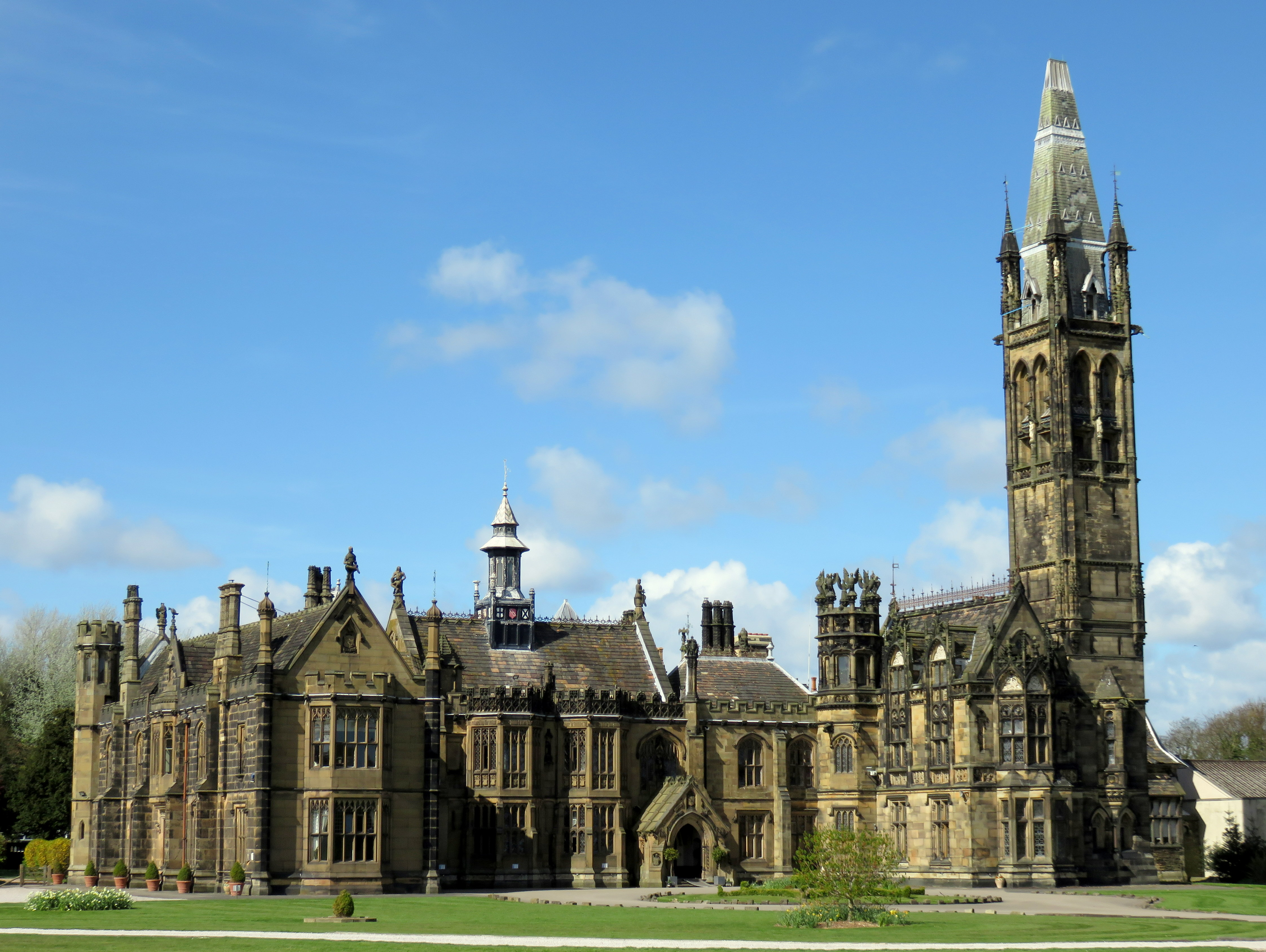

- Location within the Borough of West Lancashire

General information
- Architectural style: Gothic Revival
- Location: Southport Road, Scarisbrick, Lancashire; England

Design and construction
- Architects: A. W. N. Pugin, E. W. Pugin

Listed Building – Grade I
- Official name: Scarisbrick Hall at 392 127
- Designated: 26 April 1963
- Reference no.: 1038565 (Hall)

Scheduled monument
- Official name: Moated site of Scarisbrick Hall.
- Designated: 12 November 1991
- Reference no.: 1011997

Listed Building – Grade II
- Official name: Scarisbrick Hall
- Designated: 1 April 1986
- Reference no.: 1000951 (Park and Gardens)

Scarisbrick Hall is a country house situated just to the south-east of the village of Scarisbrick in Lancashire, England. It is currently home to Scarisbrick Hall School.

Parts of the present building, which is considered to be one of the finest examples of Victorian Gothic architecture in England, were designed by the architect Augustus Pugin. The most notable feature of Scarisbrick Hall is the 100-foot tower, which is visible from many miles around.

== History ==
Scarisbrick Hall was the ancestral home of the Scarisbrick family and dates back to the time of King Stephen (1135–1154). The moated site of the original Scarisbrick Hall lies 140 metres (460 ft) north-west of the present building. A tree-covered island measuring c.100 by 50 metres (330 by 160 ft) is flanked on two sides by a still waterlogged moat, with the north-eastern arm formed by Eas Brook. This half-timbered, manor house is recorded in an early 13th-century deed. The area is protected by scheduled monument status.

=== Charles Scarisbrick ===
Charles Scarisbrick (1801–1860) inherited Scarisbrick Hall in 1833. An art collector, Scarisbrick was a patron of both the painter John Martin and the designer A. W. N. Pugin. The Hall had been already been remodelled around 1815 in the Gothic style, to designs of the Liverpool joiner John Slater and Thomas Rickman. Then parts of the present Victorian Gothic building were altered from 1837 to designs by Pugin.

=== Lady Scarisbrick ===
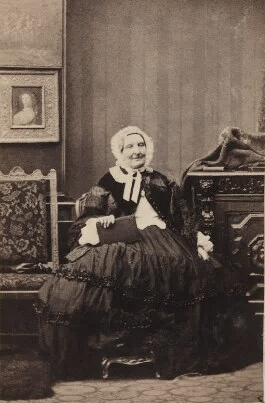
Lady Scarisbrick, 1862 photograph

Anne Scarisbrick Eccleston, then known as Dame Anne Hunloke, inherited the Scarisbrick estate from her brother Charles in 1860 at the age of 72. On 17 October 1860 she changed her surname to Scarisbrick.

==== Early life ====
Anne Eccleston (1788–1872), a noted beauty in her youth, married in 1807 Sir Thomas Windsor Hunloke, 5th Baronet (1773–1816) of Wingerworth Hall, Derbyshire, 15 years her senior. He died of fever in 1816, in Paris. Harriet Leveson-Gower, Countess Granville met Lady Hunloke at the theatre in 1817, in Paris, who complained about French manners, and wrote to Georgiana Cavendish (then Lady George Morpeth):

Lady Hunloke was at the play, looking very handsome. She is just as childish and harmless as ever.

==== Family ====
The couple had one son (born 1812), the 6th Baronet, and two daughters. Of the daughters, Domina Charlotta (1808–1857) did not marry. Eliza Margaret (1810–1878) married in 1835 Leon Rémy de Biaudos, Marquis de Castéja, a French nobleman with a title originating from Dax, Landes.

==== Works at Scarisbrick Hall ====
Lady Scarisbrick returned to Scarisbrick Hall in 1861; she had inherited the building, but the furniture had been sold in November 1860.

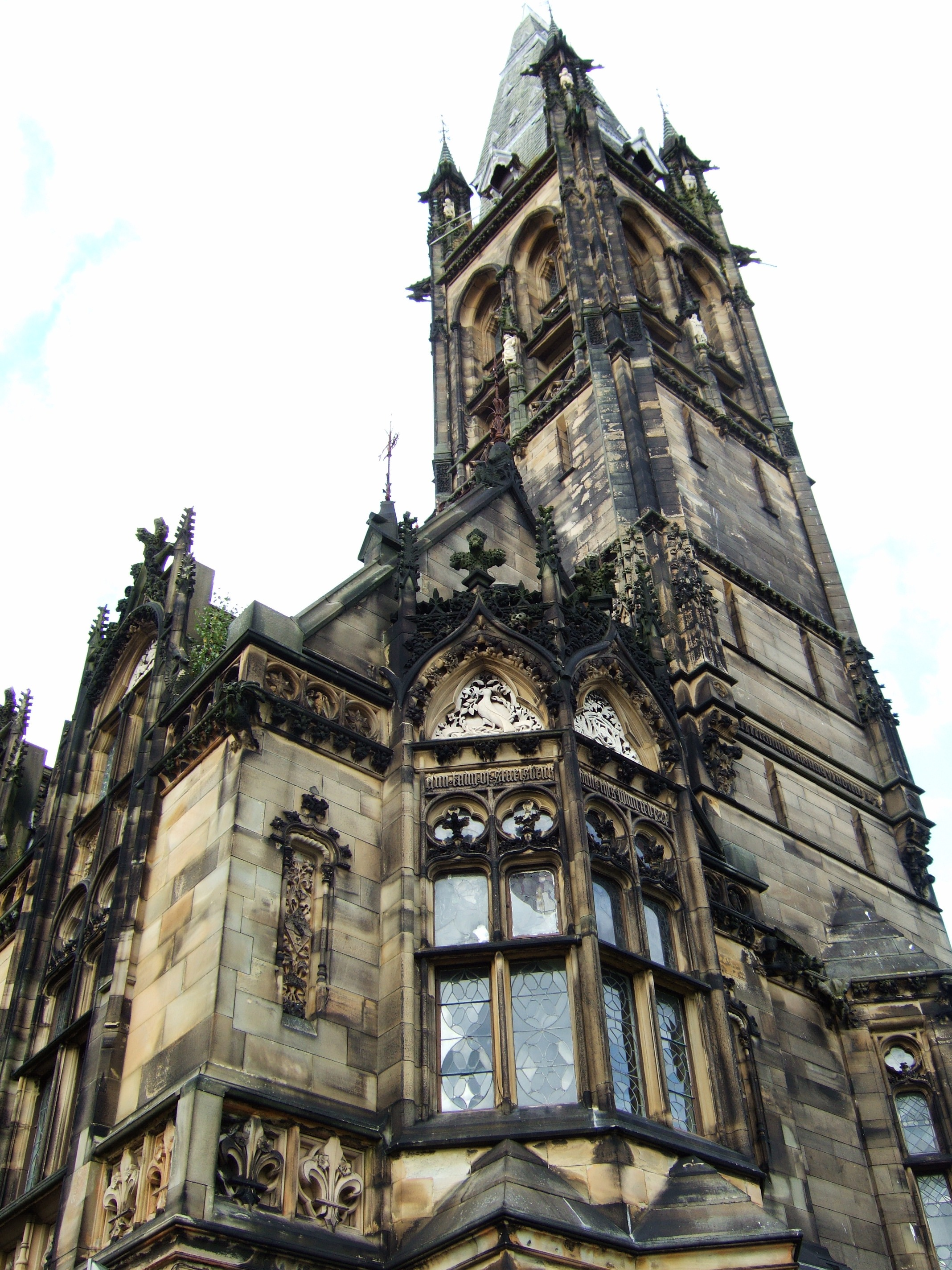
The Gothic tower at Scarisbrick Hall

Renovations were carried out by E. W. Pugin, the son of A. W. N. Pugin. The existing clock tower by the elder Pugin, added by Charles Scarisbrick and an influence on the design for Big Ben, was replaced by the younger Pugin with a taller French Gothic tower, who also added the east wing.

==== Death and legacy ====
Lady Scarisbrick lived to the age of 83, dying at Scarisbrick Hall on 6 March 1872. Her son-in-law the Marquis de Castéja then inherited the Scarisbrick Hall estate. On his death, the Hall became the seat of her grandson Marie Emmanuel Alvar de Biaudos, heir to the title Marquis de Castéja.

In May 1923, André de Biaudos, Marquis de Castéja announced that the Hall was to be put up for auction. By the end of June, he had sold it by private treaty to Thomas Scarisbrick, grandson of Charles Scarisbrick. The family lived there until the house was sold in 1946 to become a training college.

=== Later history ===
The building is now occupied by Scarisbrick Hall School, founded in 1964 by Charles Oxley. That year, 26 acres (11 ha) of the Scarisbrick Hall estate was put up for sale. It was purchased by the South West Lancashire Girl Guides for £10,000 and in May 1967 it opened as the South West Lancashire Girl Guide County Camp Site.

Scarisbrick Hall is a Grade I listed building and is on the Buildings at Risk Register. The cost of repairs to the building has been estimated at £2.46 million.

== Gallery ==
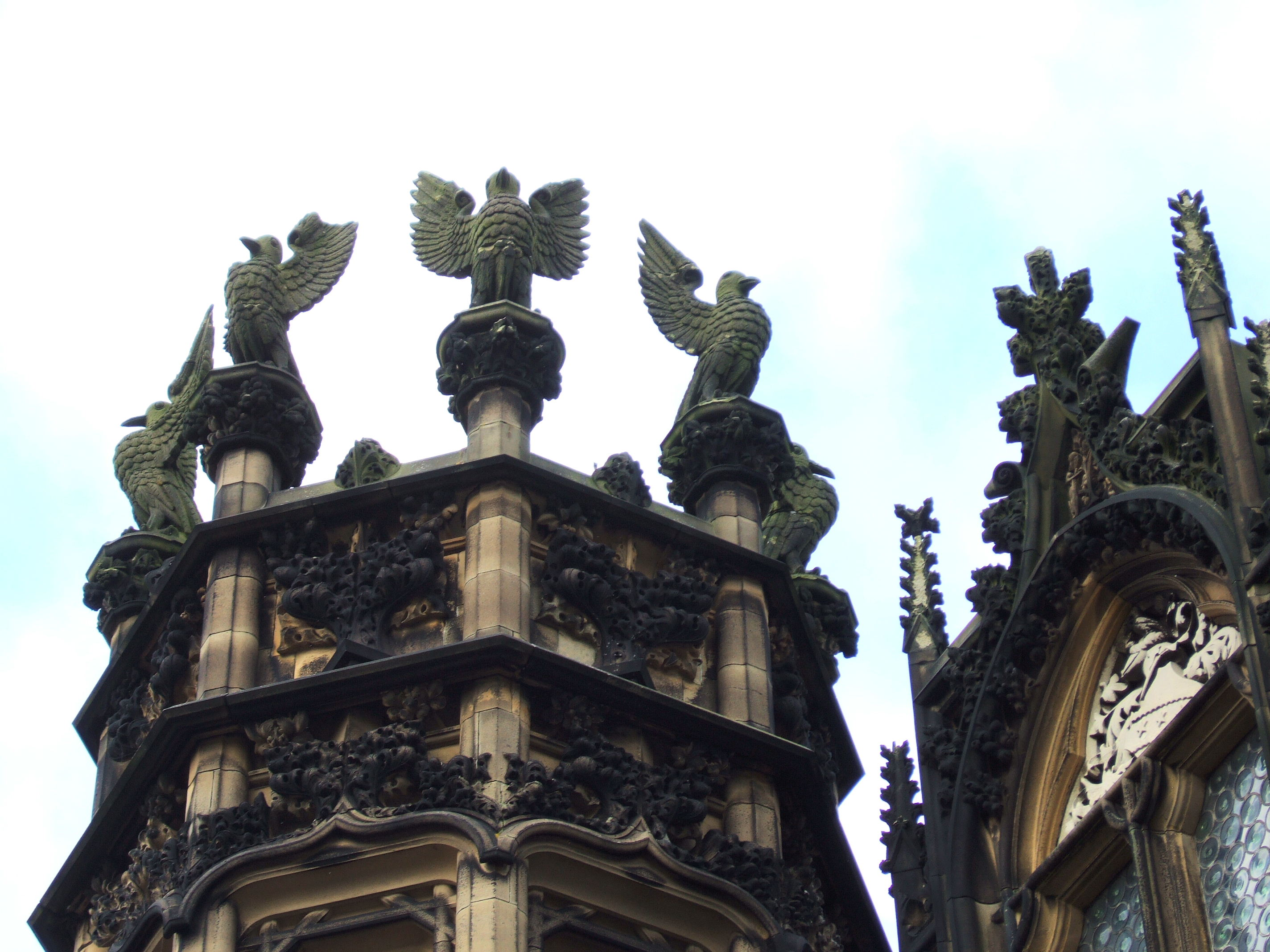
Detail of sculptures on turret

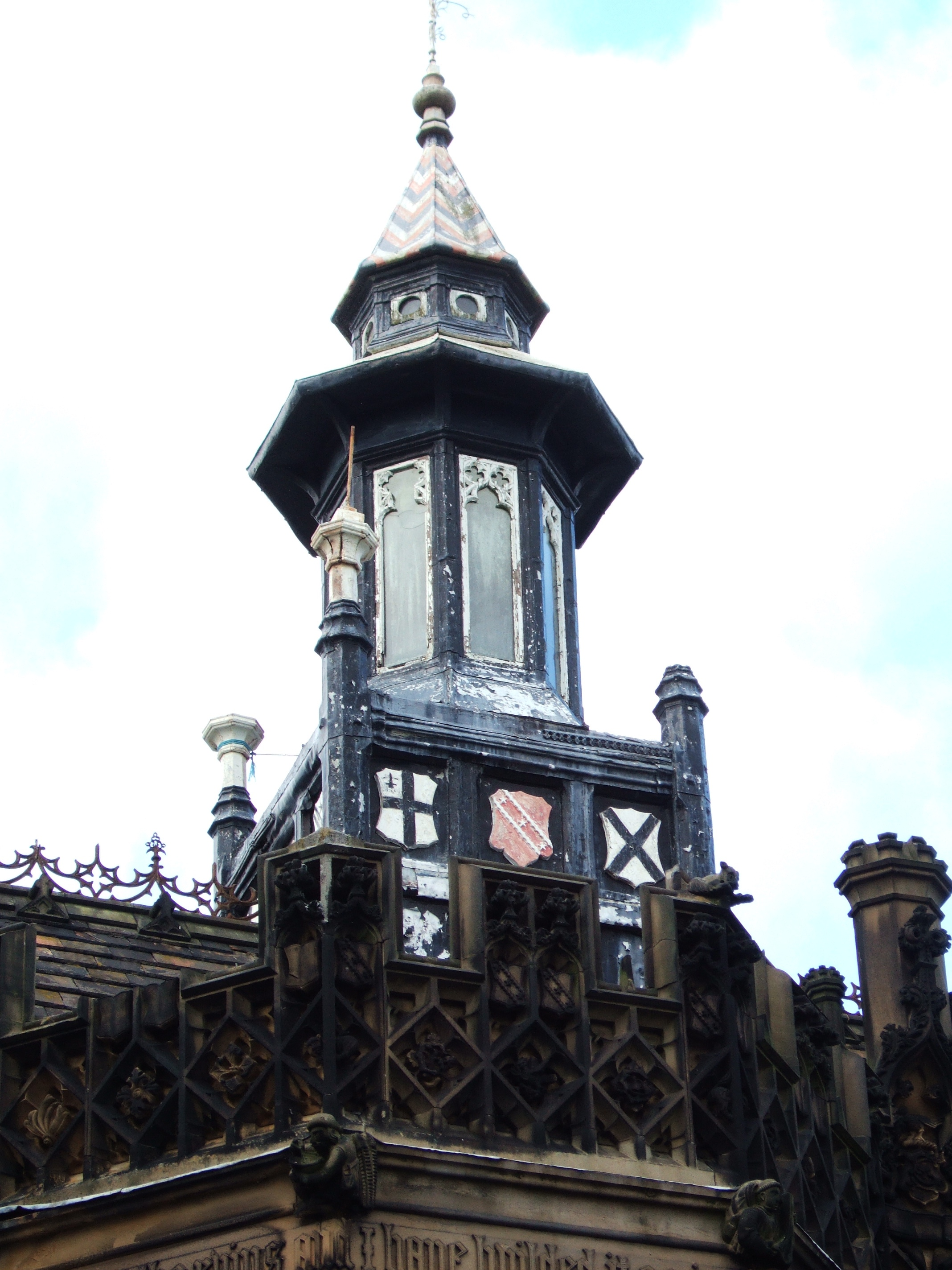
Lantern above great hall

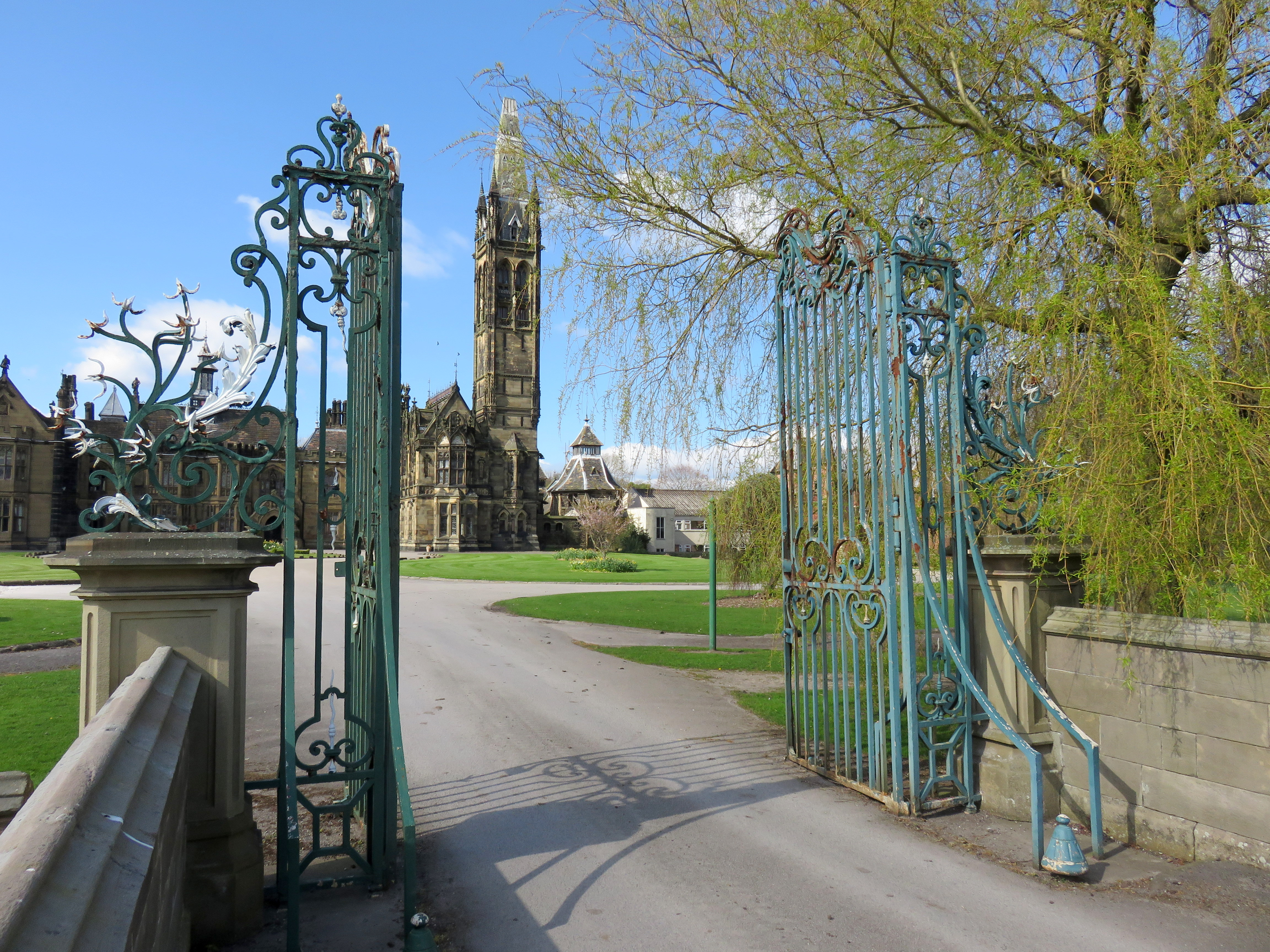
Gates

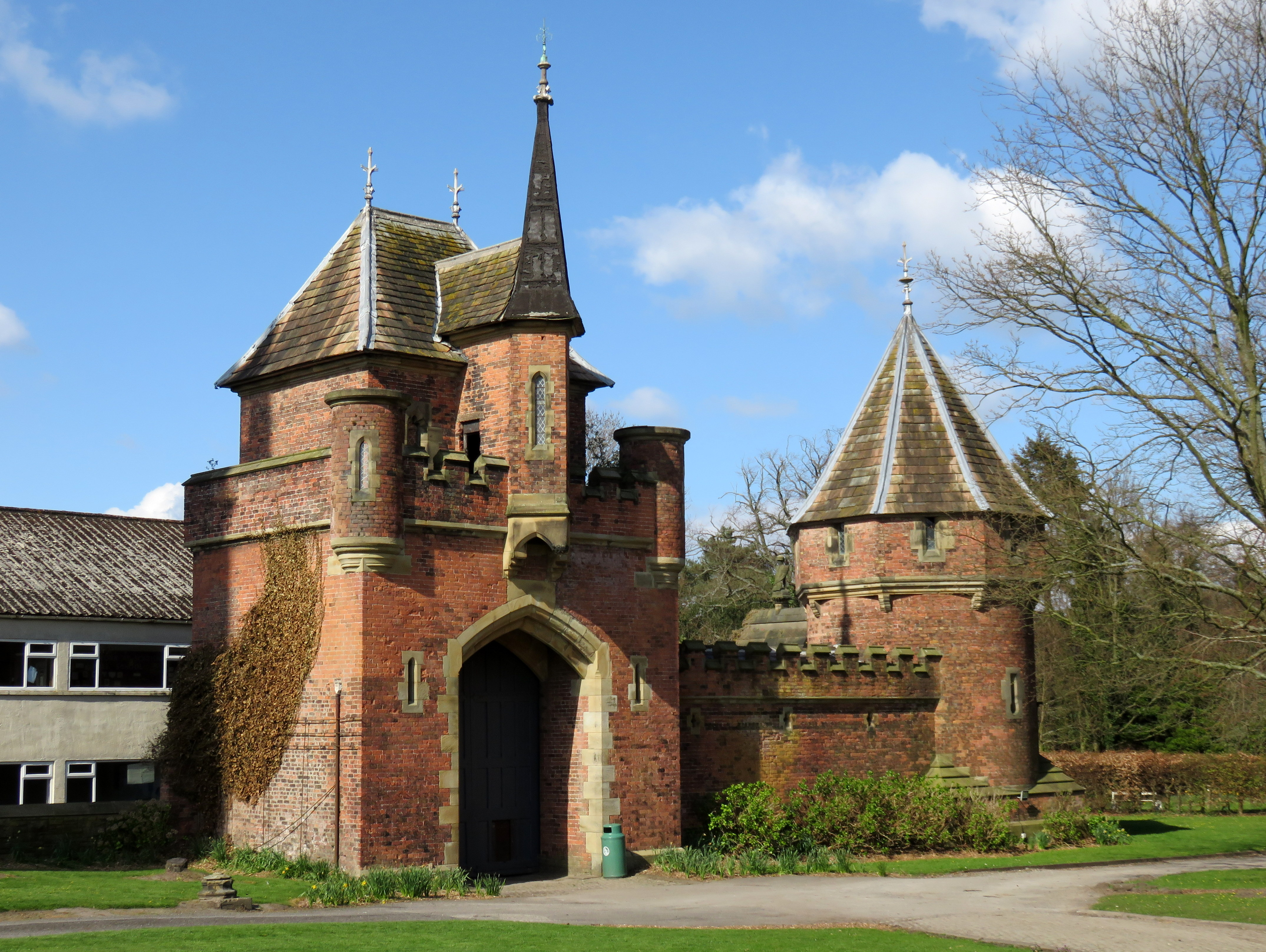
Stables

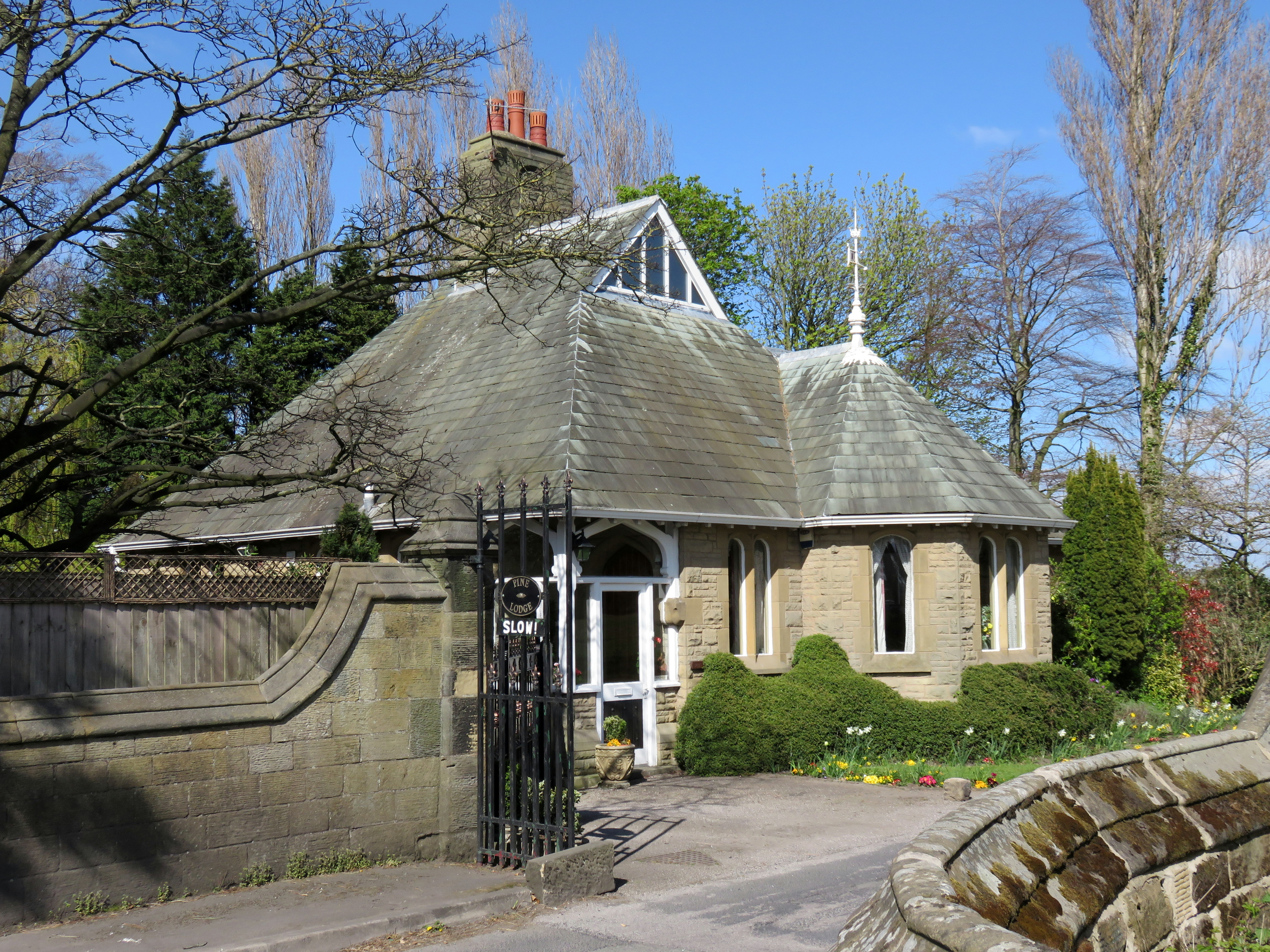
Entrance lodge

== See also ==
- Listed buildings in Scarisbrick
- Scheduled monuments in Lancashire
