= Rufford =

Rufford may refer to:

- Rufford, Lancashire, England
  - site of Rufford New Hall, Rufford Old Hall and Rufford railway station
- Rufford, Nottinghamshire, England
  - site of Rufford Abbey
