= Haskayne =

Village in Lancashire, England

Coordinates: 53.565°N 2.968°W

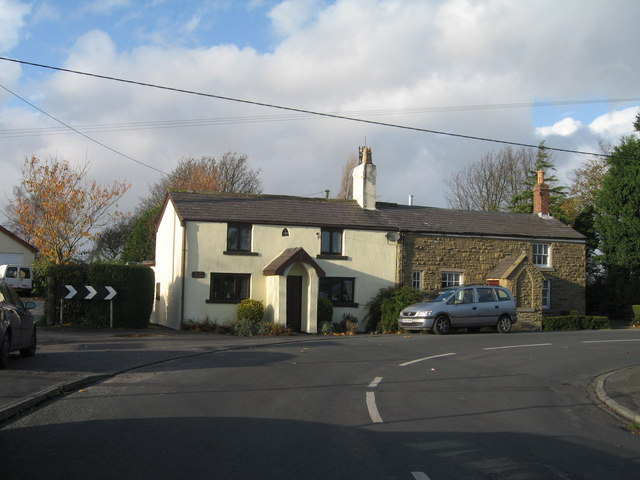
- Old Schoolhouse

- Location in West Lancashire Location within Lancashire
- OS grid reference: SD359080
  - London: 185 mi (298 km) SE
- Civil parish: Downholland
- District: West Lancashire
- Shire county: Lancashire
- Region: North West
- Country: England
- Sovereign state: United Kingdom
- Post town: ORMSKIRK
- Postcode district: L39
- Dialling code: 01704
- Police: Lancashire
- Fire: Lancashire
- Ambulance: North West
- UK Parliament: West Lancashire

Haskayne is a small village in the county of Lancashire, England, and on the West Lancashire Coastal Plain. It is to the north of Downholland Cross on the A5147 and the Leeds and Liverpool Canal.Local residents are known as skayners.

The village is in Downholland civil parish, and forms part of the Aughton & Downholland ward, which is represented by three Conservative Party councillors and is part of the district of West Lancashire.

== Toponymy ==
The name Haskayne is of Brittonic origin. The first element is hesg, meaning "sedge" (Welsh hesg, Breton hesk, Irish seisc; see Heskin). The second is one of two suffixes, the singularitve -en, or -en meaning "distinguished by...".

== See also ==
- Listed buildings in Downholland
