= Martin Mere =

Marshland area near Burscough, in Lancashire, England

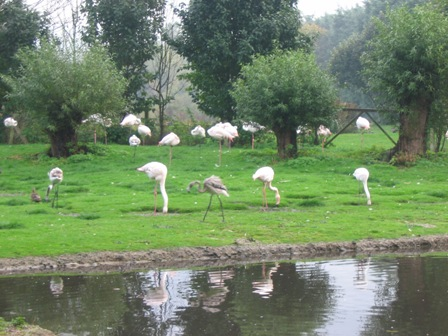
- Flamingos at Martin Mere Wetland Centre

- Location in West Lancashire Location in Lancashire
- Location: Lancashire
- Coordinates: 53°37′21″N 2°52′7″W
- Type: mere
- Basin countries: United Kingdom

Ramsar Wetland
- Official name: Martin Mere
- Designated: 28 November 1985
- Reference no.: 324

Martin Mere is a mere near Burscough, in Lancashire, England, on the West Lancashire Coastal Plain. The mere is a vast marsh, around grid reference SD 41 15 that was, until it was drained, the largest body of fresh water in England.

== History ==
Martin Mere was formed at the end of the last ice age, when water filled a depression in the glacial drift. Since then its size has varied as water levels have risen and fallen. The original giant lake can be seen on Christopher Saxton's map from 1579 and stretched from Rufford in the east, to Churchtown (then known as North Meols) in the west. To the north of the lake were the villages of Mere Brow and Holmeswood, the site of Holmeswood Hall, built by the Heskeths as a hunting lodge. South of the lake was the Scarisbrick Hall estate, Martin Hall and Tarlefarwood, now known as Tarlscough.

The mere originally drained out in two places; at the western end the arm of the mere known as the Wyke drained into the Pool (or Old Pool) at what is now Crowland Street, Blowick, while at its eastern end it flowed into the river Douglas at Rufford. Active management of the mere began in 1692 when Thomas Fleetwood of Bank Hall cut a channel in an attempt to drain it. Further attempts to drain it were made in the 1780s, but effective drainage was achieved only in the mid-19th century, with the introduction of steam pumping.

Farms and market gardens were established on the rich soils of the reclaimed land. Between 1974 and 1982 sand from the former lake bed was quarried for use in glass-making at Mere Sands Wood which is now a nature reserve.

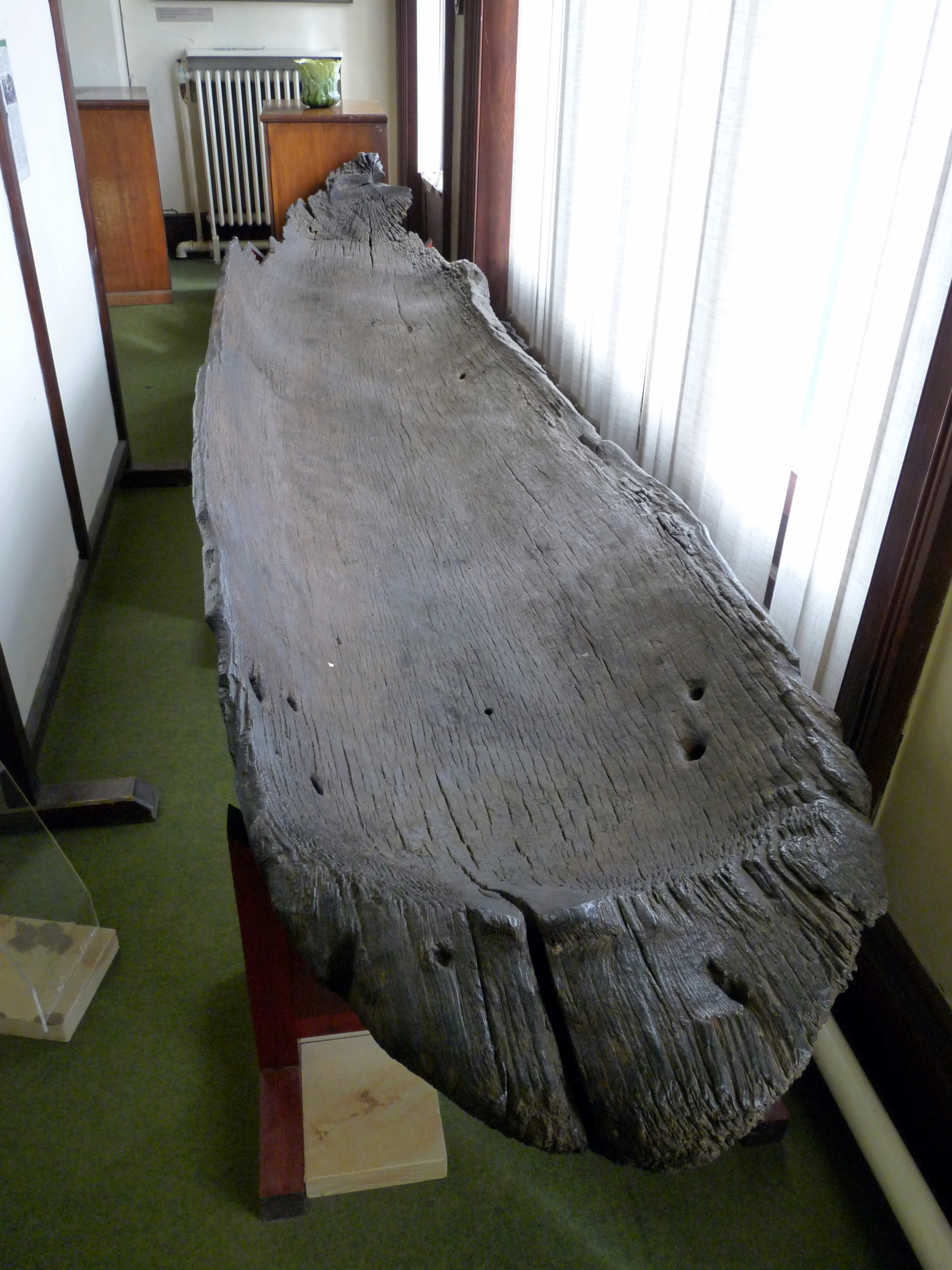
Martin Mere canoe in the Botanic Gardens Museum, Southport

An ancient canoe has been excavated from Martin Mere and is on display in the Atkinson Art Gallery and Library.

== Prehistory and legend ==
The depression in the land which would later become Martin Mere was formed at the end of the Devensian glaciation in Britain, the last glaciation before the current interglacial period, the Flandrian. As glaciers retreated from northwest England, they left behind a vast expanse of boulder clay, the product of glaciers grinding on the rock's surface.

As the glaciers retreated northwards during summer, the environment of northwest England became very wet. "The newly formed valleys of the Mersey, Ribble, Dee and Lake District rivers likely created a large delta in the Irish Sea, around 50 miles (80 km) west of the current coastline. Around 12,000 years ago, sea levels were approximately 164 feet (50m) lower than today, and the entire Lancashire plain, along with the land to its west, was a freshwater landscape of rivers, streams and lakes". These lakes formed in depressions within the boulder clay, and one of these, south of the Ribble, gradually developed into the early Martin Mere.

The environment at the time was dominated by glaciers to the north, and tundra-like environments with sparse vegetation and little megafauna, though polar bears, arctic foxes and reindeer will have been present. Flora would have included Salix herbacea and birch trees.

Local legend has it that the lake was home to the nymph Vivian, who stole the knight Lancelot as a child, and brought him up in the depths of the lake's waters. Lancelot was reputed to have been the ruler of Lancashire, the county being named after him.

== Present ==
Part of the old mere is now the site of Martin Mere Wetland Centre, a wetland nature reserve managed by the Wildfowl and Wetlands Trust.

== See also ==
- WWT Martin Mere
