= Duke of Devonshire (disambiguation) =

Duke of Devonshire is a 1694 title in the Peerage of England, held by members of the Cavendish family.

Duke of Devonshire may also refer to:

- William Cavendish, 4th Duke of Devonshire (1720–1764), Prime Minister of Great Britain 1756–1757
- Duke of Devonshire Emerald, jewel acquired by the 6th Duke of Devonshire in 1831 from Emperor Pedro I of Brazil
- Duke of Devonshire (apple), fruit cultivar raised in Lancashire in 1835 and introduced in 1875
