= Listed buildings in Rufford, Lancashire =

Rufford is a civil parish in the West Lancashire district of Lancashire, England. It contains ten buildings that are recorded in the National Heritage List for England as designated listed buildings. Of these, one is listed at Grade I, the highest of the three grades, and the others are at Grade II, the lowest grade. The parish contains the villages of Rufford and Holmeswood, as well as the surrounding countryside. The most important building in the parish is Rufford Old Hall; this and associated structures are listed. The Rufford Branch of the Leeds and Liverpool Canal passes through the parish and a lock on it is listed. The other listed buildings include houses, a church and a cross base in the churchyard, and a public house.

== Key ==
Grade	Criteria
I	Buildings of exceptional interest, sometimes considered to be internationally important
II	Buildings of national importance and special interest

== Buildings ==
Name and location	Photograph	Date	Notes	Grade
Sundial; 53.63493°N 2.81188°W	—	Medieval	This consists of the stone base of a medieval preaching cross, which was moved into the churchyard of St Mary's Church in 1818. Later in that century it was used as the base for a sundial.	II
Rufford Old Hall; 53.63775°N 2.81351°W		c. 1530	The oldest part is a timber-framed hall on a stone plinth with a stone-slate roof. It contains a doorway with a four-centred arch, mullioned and transomed windows, a two-storey, semi-octagonal oriel window, and decorative timber-framing including quatrefoils. On the roof is a lantern. At right angles to the hall is a wing built in 1662. It is in brick with stone dressings, and contains cross windows, casements and gabled dormers. Between the hall and the wing are two timber-framed and gabled bays, and to the north is a service wing, all added in the 19th century. Inside the hall is a hammerbeam roof.	I
80 Liverpool Road and wall 53.63258°N 2.81762°W	—	Early to mid 18th century	A brick house with a stone-slate roof, in two storeys and two bays. The doorway and windows have segmental heads, the windows being casements. The garden wall is in sandstone blocks with rounded coping and includes two gateposts with rounded tops.	II
Ice house 53.63765°N 2.82559°W	—	Late 18th century (probable)	The ice house is in Rufford Park. It consists of an egg-shaped chamber approached by a vaulted passage, both in brick, the whole being covered in earth. The structure is surrounded by a circular ha-ha about 35 metres (115 ft) in diameter, its retaining wall being in sandstone.	II
Hesketh Arms; 53.63358°N 2.81706°W		Late 18th century (probable)	The main block of the public house is stuccoed with quoins and a hipped slate roof. It has a square plan with sides of three bays. The entrance front is symmetrical, and has a central doorway with engaged Tuscan columns, fluted entablatures, a moulded open pediment, and a semicircular fanlight. The windows are sashes.	II
Rufford New Hall; 53.64090°N 2.82470°W		1760	A country house that was extended in 1798, later used as a hospital, and then converted into flats. It is in roughcast brick with a parapet and a hipped slate roof. The building has two storeys and an irregular plan; the south front is symmetrical with five bays, and there are eight bays on the left return and six on the right. In the centre of the south front is a portico with four Ionic unfluted columns, and a tripartite doorway with a fanlight. On the right return is a portico covering four bays, with six Ionic columns. At the rear on the left side is a service wing with an Ionic colonnade. The windows are sashes.	II
Canal lock 53.63248°N 2.81060°W		c. 1780	The lock is on the Rufford Branch of the Leeds and Liverpool Canal. It is in sandstone and has wooden gates with iron furnishings. On the west side is an overflow channel.	II
2 and 4 Church Road; 53.63474°N 2.81402°W	—	c. 1800	A pair of rendered cottages with a hipped slate roof in Gothic style. There are two storeys, each cottage has one bay and a lean-to porch on the side. There are two windows in each floor; every window has two arched lights and contains geometrical leaded glazing.	II
Cottage, coach-house and stables, Rufford Old Hall; 53.63806°N 2.81307°W	—	Early 19th century (possible)	The buildings form a row facing the courtyard at the rear of the hall, and are in sandstone with slate roofs. The cottage, on the left, has two storeys, a doorway with large jambs, and cross windows. The coach house and stables to the right are at a lower level. They contain a large segmental-arched wagon entrance, doorways and pitching holes.	II
St Mary's Church; 53.63505°N 2.81188°W		1869	The church, by Danson and Davies in Gothic Revival style, is in red brick with dressings and bands in sandstone and blue brick, and it has a slate roof with red ridge tiles. The church consists of a nave with a clerestory, aisles, a chancel with a north chapel and a south vestry, and a northwest steeple. The steeple has a west doorway, a clock face on the west side, a set-back belfry stage, and a steep pyramidal spire.	II
