= Downholland =

- Civil parish
- Location in West Lancashire Location in Lancashire
- Coordinates: 53.553°N 2.958°W
- Country: England
- Primary council: West Lancashire
- County: Lancashire
- Region: North West England
- Status: Parish

Population (2011)
  - Total: 913

Downholland is a civil parish in Lancashire, England, on the West Lancashire Coastal Plain. The population at the 2011 census was 913. The area contains several villages including Haskayne, Barton and Downholland Cross, and the Leeds and Liverpool Canal and the A5147. It also contains attractions such as Farmer Ted's.

Downholland was originally a township in the parish of Halsall, becoming formally a separate parish in 1866. It formed part of West Lancashire Rural District and, since 1974, is part of the West Lancashire district.

Downholland is located very near the fields that were the purported location of Argleton.

== See also ==
- Listed buildings in Downholland
