= Lord Suffield (disambiguation) =

Lord Suffield is the title given to the holders of the Suffield barony.

It could also refer to:

- Lord Suffield (1816 ship), a merchant ship
- Lord Suffield (apple), a variety of apple
