= Rufford Old Hall =

Grade I listed house in Lancashire, England

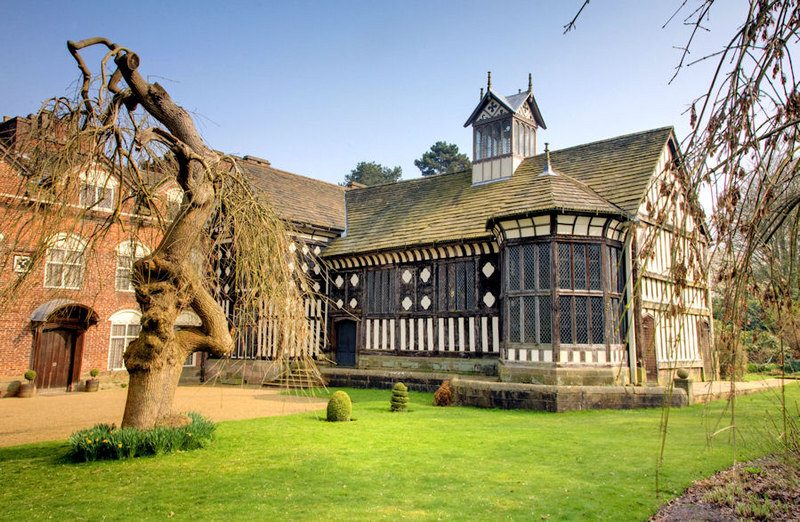
- The great hall, the oldest surviving part of the house

- Location of Rufford Old Hall in the borough of West Lancashire
- 53.637915°N 2.813691°W
- Type: Hall house
- Location: Rufford, England

History
- Built: Late 15th century to 1820s

Site notes
- Architectural styles: Tudor, Jacobean, Gothic Revival
- Owner: The National Trust

Listed Building – Grade I
- Official name: Rufford Old Hall

Listed Building – Grade II
- Official name: Cottage, coach house and stables circa 10 metres east of wing of Rufford Old Hall

Rufford Old Hall is a National Trust property in Rufford, Lancashire, in north-west England. Built in the late fifteenth or early sixteenth centuries for the Hesketh family, only the great hall survives from the original structure. A brick-built wing in the Jacobean style was added in 1661, at right angles to the great hall, and a third wing was added in the 1820s.

The hall is designated by English Heritage as a Grade I listed building, and the cottage, coach house and stables in the courtyard at the rear of the hall are designated Grade II.

Rufford features the only known surviving example of a sixteenth-century carved wooden screen made of bog oak; a collection of rural memorabilia displayed in the stables and throughout the house; and a collection of arms and armour from the fifteenth to the seventeenth-century. The best-known feature of the Victorian gardens is a giant pair of topiary squirrels.

== History ==
=== Early years ===
Rufford Old Hall – located in the village of Rufford, Lancashire, seven miles (eleven kilometres) north of Ormskirk – was built for the Hesketh family, lords of the manor of Rufford. The present owner, the National Trust, dates the building to around 1530, but the architectural historian Nikolaus Pevsner puts the date earlier, at the late fifteenth century, comparing the architecture with contemporary historic houses in Lancashire: Smithills Hall, Ordsall Hall and Samlesbury Hall. Some sources state that it was built for Sir Robert Hesketh, but Pevsner calls this guesswork. The Trust suggests his father, Sir Thomas Hesketh, as builder. There is a local tradition that the young William Shakespeare performed at the hall, although there is no evidence to substantiate it. (Note: According to this tradition, the seventeen-year-old Shakespeare accompanied a Roman Catholic sympathiser, John Cottam or Cottom, to Lancashire; a "William Shakeshafte" appears in the household accounts of Alexander Hoghton, a prominent Catholic living within ten miles of the Cottam family seat. Hoghton in his will commended this Shakeshafte to a fellow Catholic landowner, Thomas Hesketh. According to this narrative Shakespeare moved to the Hesketh family seat, at Rufford, where he encountered travelling troupes of players, such as Lord Derby's Men, and embarked on a theatrical career. But Shakeshafte was a common surname in Lancashire and there is no evidence that the William Shakeshafte who was in Hesketh's employment was the same man as the playwright. The National Trust's 2007 guide to Rufford Old Hall nevertheless maintains, without saying why, that he "almost certainly" was.)

The oldest surviving part of the hall is a timber-framed manor house. The great hall is the central part of an H-shaped structure which originally had two wings. It is an outstanding example of Tudor hammerbeam construction, richly carved and broadly proportioned. The timber-framed west wing containing the family apartments has disappeared, reportedly burnt down, and in 1662 a new brick building with accommodation for both family and servants was built to the north of the east wing. The east wing was rebuilt in the 1720s using sixteenth-century timbers brought from Holmeswood Hall, another Hesketh residence, not far from Rufford. It contains the dining room, anteroom and first-floor drawing room.

=== 18th century to present day ===
By the mid-eighteenth century, Tudor houses like Rufford were regarded as old fashioned and insufficiently luxurious. Sir Thomas Hesketh, first baronet, had a more comfortable house built in neo-classical style – Rufford New Hall – nearby. The house was abandoned as a residence in about 1798, after which it was for a time occupied by a tenant farmer, and the banqueting hall housed a village school. It was repaired and refitted in 1821 for the eldest son of the family, Thomas Henry Hesketh. The east wing was enlarged and remodelled in Tudor Gothic style, to complement both the half-timbered great hall on one side and the red-brick building of 1662 on the other. Thomas Henry Hesketh lived there until his succession to the estates as the fourth baronet in 1842. According to the National Trust, the antiquarian treatment in the 1820s, following on from that of the 1720s, firmly established Rufford Old Hall as "a house of Gothic romance, for which the Victorian Heskeths delighted in acquiring old oak furniture, stained glass and arms and armour". Simon Jenkins is less convinced by the Victorian Jacobethan additions, suggesting that they give the hall's exterior, "too much the appearance of a Swiss chalet".

In 1867 the Heskeths inherited the estate of Easton Neston in Northamptonshire, and from that time Rufford ceased to be the main family seat. From 1920 the Old Hall was briefly occupied by Thomas Fermor-Hesketh, later first Baron Hesketh, who in 1936 presented the house and its grounds to the National Trust, together with historically important contents and a well-established Victorian garden.

From the start of its ownership, the National Trust sought to equip the hall with furniture contemporary with the original building. In 1937 the trust appealed for donations so that the hall could be furnished, as far as possible, as it was at the time it was built. The hall became a popular attraction for visitors, even during the Second World War. The timbers in the great hall have twice suffered attack from death watch beetle, in 1948 and 1958, threatening the gable end of the great hall with collapse, and causing considerable outlay on remedial work. It was necessary to dismantle the whole roof and steep the timbers to render them immune to the beetle before the timbers could be replaced.

The hall is reputedly haunted by at least three ghosts: a grey lady, a man in Elizabethan clothing, and Queen Elizabeth I. (Note: Reported hauntings were taken with a degree of seriousness. In the 1940s Philip Ashcroft, whose collection of south-west Lancashire rural memorabilia is displayed at Rufford, gave talks locally on "Ghosts I have seen".)

== Architecture ==
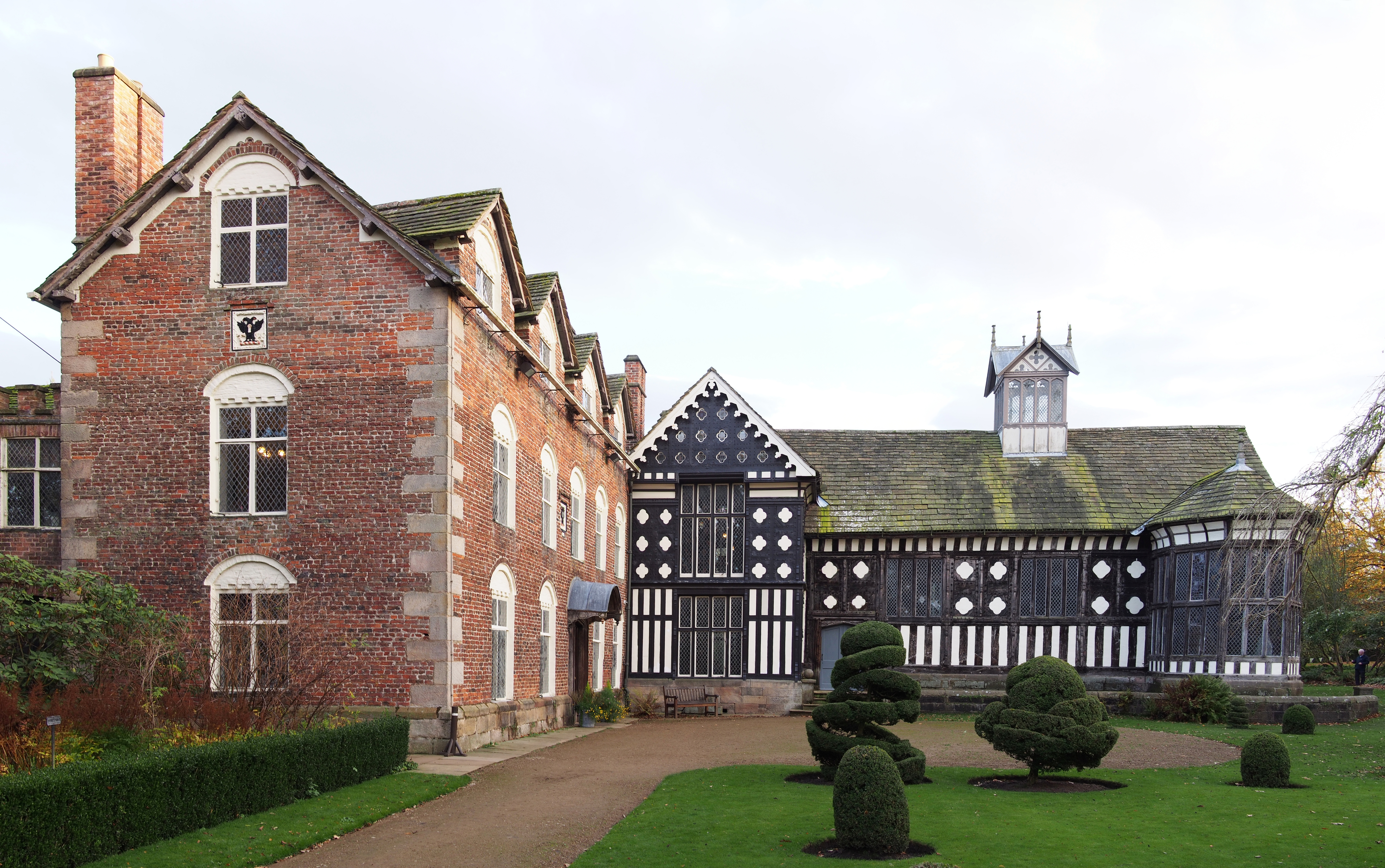
Front view

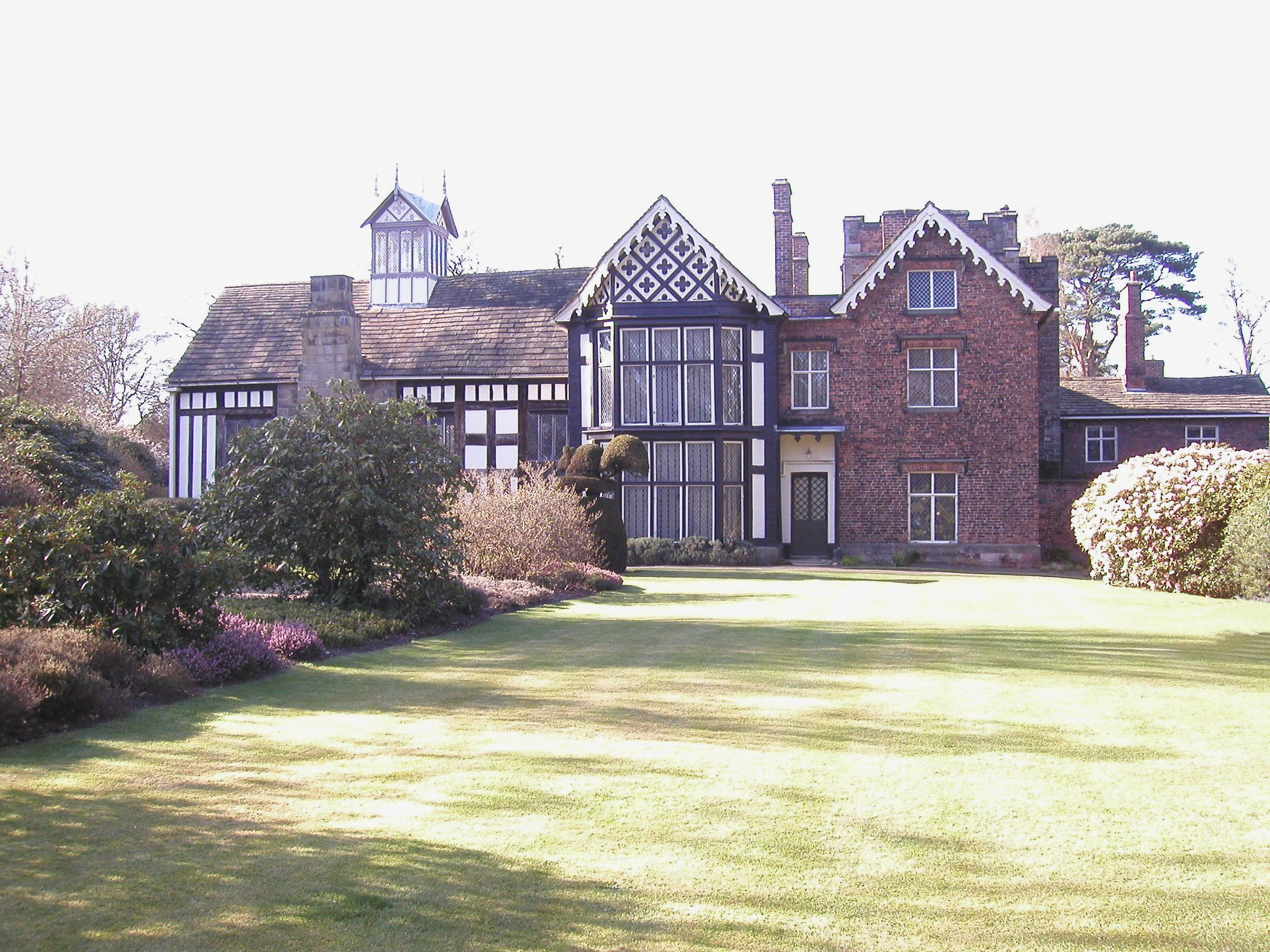
Rear view

In his 1969 volume on the buildings of Lancashire, Pevsner writes:

As you approach Rufford Old Hall, you see in front of you the cheerful quatrefoiled façade of the hall itself, and you will recognize at once the usual doorway which must lead to a screens passage and the usual bay window which must give light and extra space to the high table.

The frontage has bay windows to the right and the entrance door to the left, alongside the more dominant, two-storey gable of the east wing.

The timber-framed hall house is in a late medieval pattern which continued in use in Tudor times. The hall, which formed the south wing, is substantially as built, 46.5 feet (14.2 m) long and 22 feet (6.7 m) wide, with the timbers sitting on a low stone wall. The prominent lantern on the roof is a nineteenth-century addition. (Note: The lantern was designed by the Liverpool architect John Foster the younger, who also refaced the east wing. The lantern is believed to have been installed to create an overhead light for billiards, one of the uses of the hall in the nineteenth century.) The hall has a flagged floor. It has a stone chimney, five bays, and a hammerbeam roof. The five hammerbeams each terminate, at both ends, in a carved wooden angel. Pevsner writes of the interior of the great hall, "It is the most overpowering of them all, of an exuberance of decoration matched nowhere else in England". In a 2007 survey of historic buildings Simon Jenkins writes, "This wonderful room embodies the splendour of Lancashire’s late Middle Ages".

In 1661 a Jacobean-style rustic brick wing was built at right angles to the great hall, which contrasts with the medieval black and white timbering. This wing was built from small two-inch bricks similar to Bank Hall, and Carr House and St Michael's Church in Much Hoole. This wing is notable for being given a symmetrical façade at a time when the prevailing style in Lancashire was still for asymmetrically disposed low mullioned windows. There are five bays and a doorway with a segmental hood (a later addition); the windows have wooden crosses and segmental relieving arches with brick decoration in their tympana.

In the 1820s a third wing was constructed, formed out of the medieval domestic offices, and a castellated tower was built to join the great hall to the Charles II wing. In the twentieth century a hidden chamber, possibly used as a priest hole in the sixteenth century, was discovered above the great hall. (Note: Pevsner, writing in 1969, describes the discovery as recent, but the supposed priest hole had been known about for many years: a 1929 article about the hall in Country Life said, "As there is a space forming a 'secret chamber' between the timbered partition above the canopy and the wall that divided hall from old withdrawing-rooms, and as, when this was 'discovered' in recent times, there was found in it 'a latin service book', the space has been set down as the 'priest's hole' of Dame Hesketh's time". Clare Hartwell, in her revised Lancashire: North volume in the Pevsner Buildings of England series, published in 2009, is more sceptical as to the priest hole, suggesting that the space uncovered by restorers could "simply have been part of the missing west wing".)

=== Fixtures and fittings ===
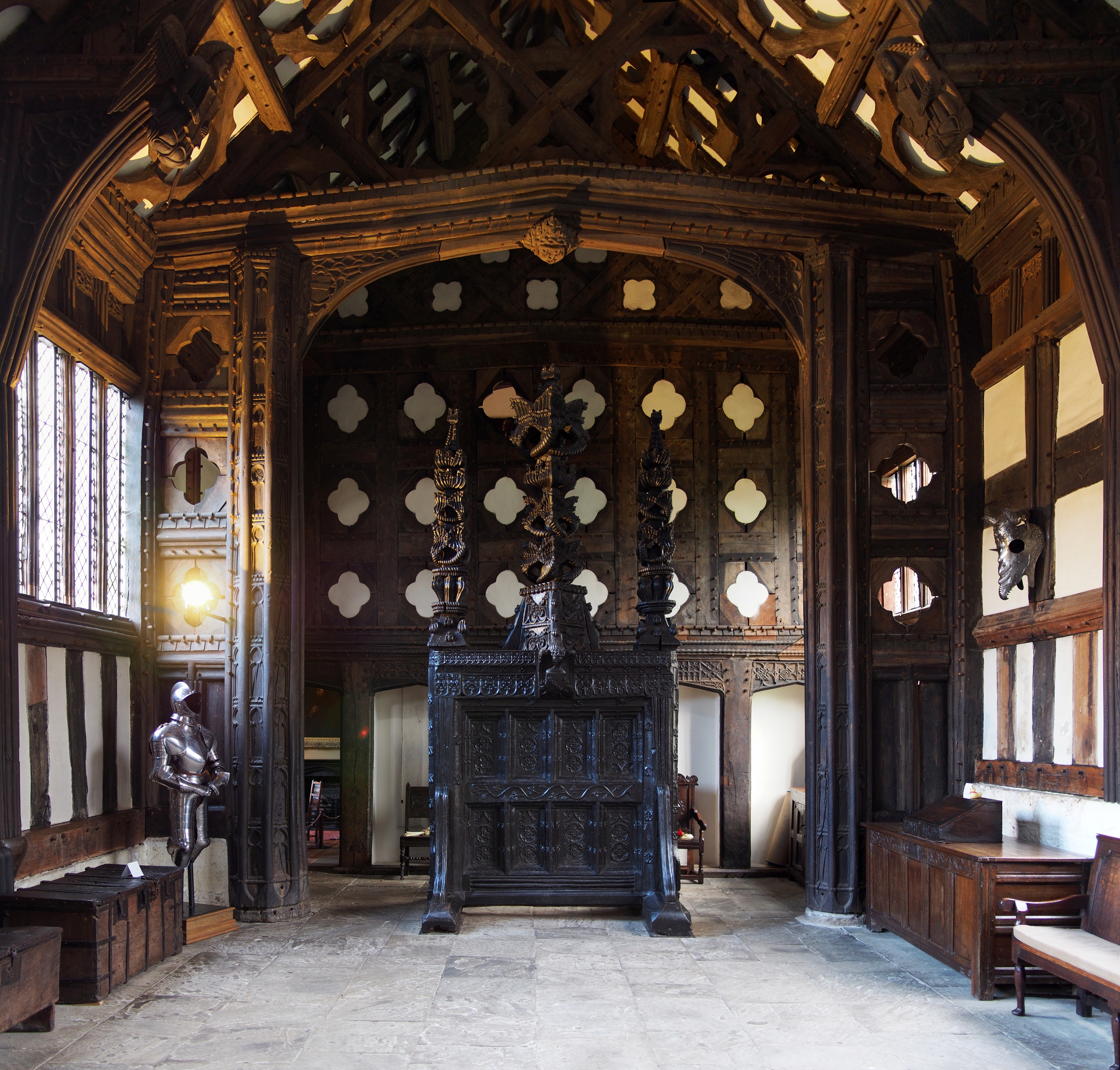
The interior of the great hall, facing the wooden screen

A carved wooden screen made of bog oak is the only known surviving example from the first half of the sixteenth century. The free-standing screen is nominally movable, but Pevsner calls it "a monster of a screen, and movable only if you accept a very optimistic meaning of the term". He continues:

The framing is by moulded posts and horizontals of great size, the infilling consists of eight traceried panels, the posts are buttressed by diagonal projections coming far forward on both sides, and on top are three enormous supporters or pinnacles of barbaric shapes, the middle one so big that it has its own angel corbels on both sides. The component parts of the supporters look like ropes or scalaria shells. You will be reminded more of Indonesia than of Lancashire.

In keeping with the character of the hall, much of the furniture is of oak. It includes an unusually large press cupboard; a sixteenth-century free-standing cabinet with carved decoration of classical heads and allegorical scenes; and two panel-back oak settles with cabriole legs, known as "couch chairs", of a type familiar in Lancashire in the eighteenth century. On the staircase is a painting by Godfrey Kneller of Thomas Hesketh, who was Second MP for Preston in 1722 and who rebuilt the east wing in the 1720s, seen with his wife Martha and son in 1723.

== Gardens ==
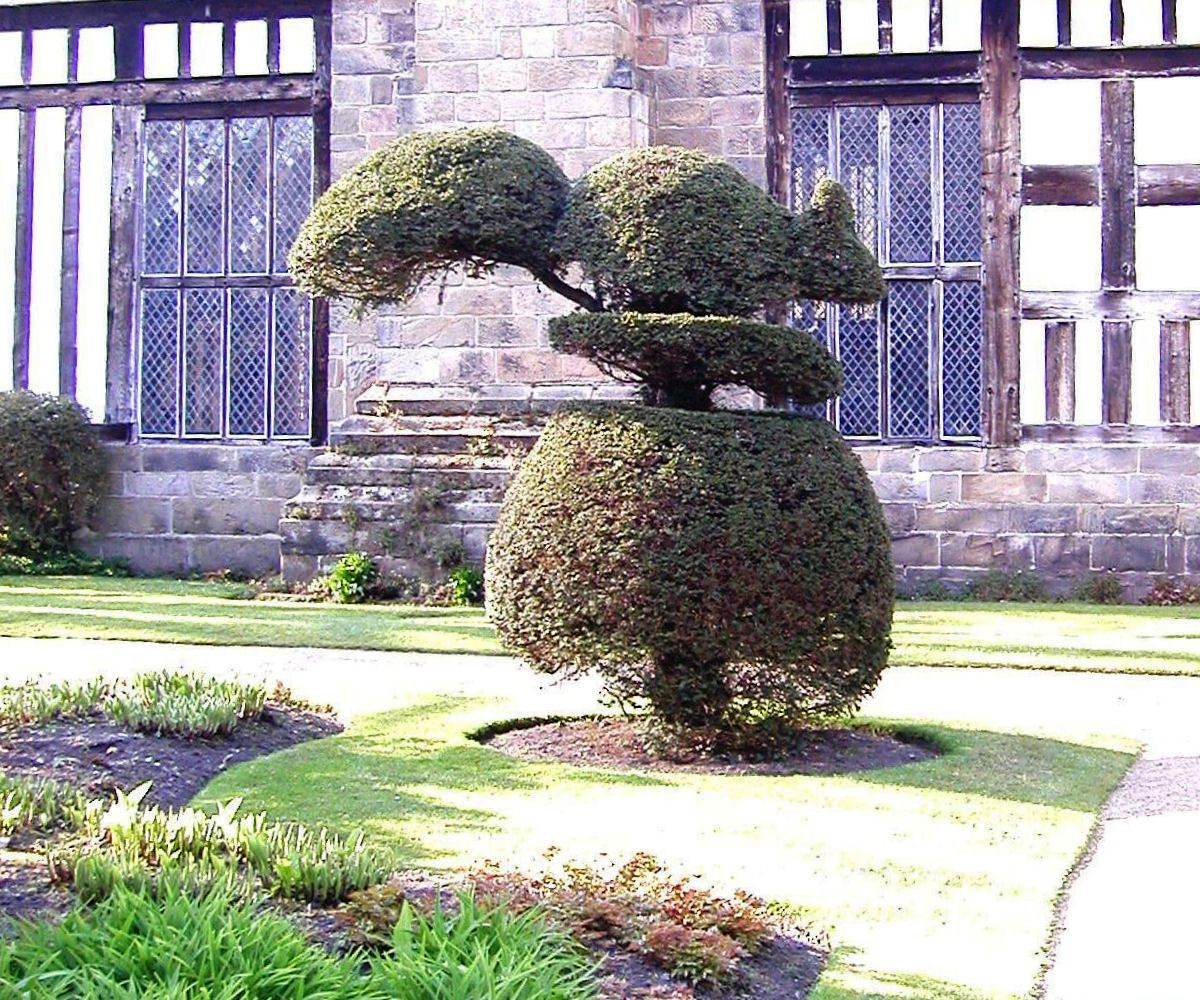
Topiary squirrel, Rufford Old Hall

Very little of the gardens' early history is known. Parks and Gardens UK suggests that the lawns surrounding the house, and some of the topiary, date from the very end of the 18th century. The present layout is Victorian, from the time when most of the existing mature trees were planted. They include sycamore, lime, oak, beech and alder. When the National Trust acquired the hall in 1936 the garden was overrun with Rhododendron ponticum, an invasive species which has gradually been controlled at Rufford. It has been replaced by ornamental rhododendrons, together with early and late summer-flowering shrubs underplanted with ground cover.

The best-known feature of the gardens is the Squirrel Border, on the south side of the great hall, with two large yew trees shaped by topiary into giant squirrels. In the early twentieth century what are now the squirrels were in the shape of peacocks. Also on the south side of the great hall is the south lawn, with extensive flower beds, a rose garden, high pine trees, statues of Venus and a dancing faun. The Beech Walk Paddock is lined by a wall of high beech trees on one side and the Rufford spur of the Leeds and Liverpool Canal on the other. At one time the Walk was the main approach to the hall from the village.

The first record of an orchard at Rufford dates from 1779, when the hall was leased to a gardener called Thomas Lowe for 21 years at an annual rent of £22 and 16 shillings (£22.80 in decimal terms, roughly equivalent to a little under £4,000 in 2025 terms). In the twenty-first century Rufford's orchard contains several varieties of blossoming apple trees, including Keswick Codlin, Duke of Devonshire, Lord Suffield and Bramley's Seedling.

== Collections ==
=== Armour ===
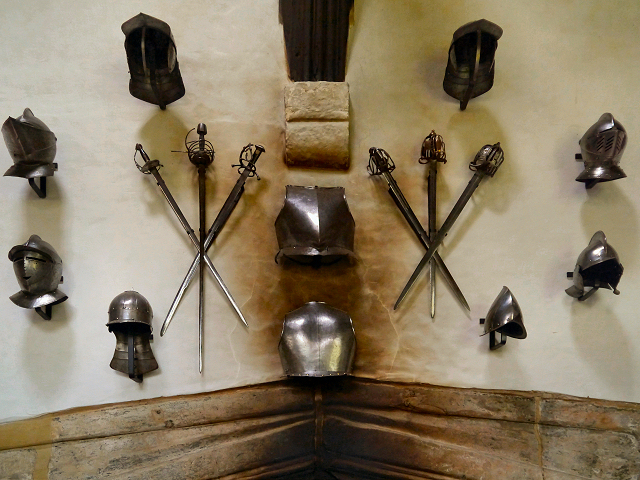
Arms and armour in the great hall

Arms and armour were traditionally kept in the great hall of medieval houses, and the Heskeths revived this tradition in the nineteenth century. The armour at Rufford is of mixed European origin and includes an Italian half-suit from about 1600, with a close helmet resembling a mask; a composite suit, mostly German, sixteenth-century, but armed with a late seventeenth-century Spanish cup-hilt sword; another mostly German suit, with the peascod breastplate fashionable in the mid-sixteenth century; and a full suit, mostly Italian from the sixteenth century.

=== Philip Ashcroft Collection ===
The stable contains some of the larger pieces of old agricultural equipment collected by Philip Ashcroft of Rufford. Those on display in the stable were generally found in outhouses or in the open air. Ashcroft, the son of a local potato merchant, conceived the idea of a village museum in 1936, to preserve some of the relics of south-west Lancashire folk life, which were disappearing in the twentieth century. The first exhibits were displayed at Rufford Old Hall in 1939. Ashcroft presented his collection to the National Trust in 1946, and continued to add to it until his death in 1959. Many of his smaller acquisitions, such as pictures, furniture. ceramics, textiles, books, toys, games and household utensils, are displayed in the furnished rooms of the hall.

== Listing ==
Rufford Old Hall is designated by English Heritage as a Grade I listed building, The cottage, coach house and stables in the courtyard at the rear of the hall are designated Grade II.

== Notes, references and sources ==
=== Sources ===
- Bryson, Bill (2009). Shakespeare. Leicester: Charnwood. ISBN 978-1-84-782610-7.
- Dean, Richard (2007). Rufford Old Hall, Lancashire. London: The National Trust. ISBN 978-1-84-359285-3.
- Greeves, Lydia (2008). Houses of the National Trust. London, UK: National Trust Books. ISBN 978-1-905-40066-9.
- Hartwell, Clare; Pevsner, Nikolaus (2009). Lancashire: North. New Haven, US and London: Yale University Press. ISBN 978-0-300-12667-9.
- Honigmann, E. A. J. (1985). Shakespeare, The 'Lost' Years. Manchester: Manchester University Press. ISBN 978-0-71-905425-9.
- Honey, Alison, ed. (1991). The National Trust Gardens Handbook. London: The National Trust. ISBN 0-7078-0135-4.
- Jenkins, Simon (2003). England's Thousand Best Houses. London, UK: Penguin Books. ISBN 978-0-713-99596-1.
- — (2007). Northwest England. London: Reader's Digest. ISBN 978-0-27-644345-9.
- Pevsner, Nikolaus (1969). Lancashire: The Rural North. London: Penguin. OCLC 902193533.
- Wells, Stanley (2003). Shakespeare: For All Time. Oxford: Oxford University Press. ISBN 978-0-19-516093-2.
- Wood, Michael (2003). Shakespeare. New York: Basic Books. ISBN 978-0-46-509264-2.

== See also ==
- Grade I listed buildings in Lancashire
- Listed buildings in Rufford, Lancashire
