= Mere Sands Wood =

Nature reserve in Lancashire, England

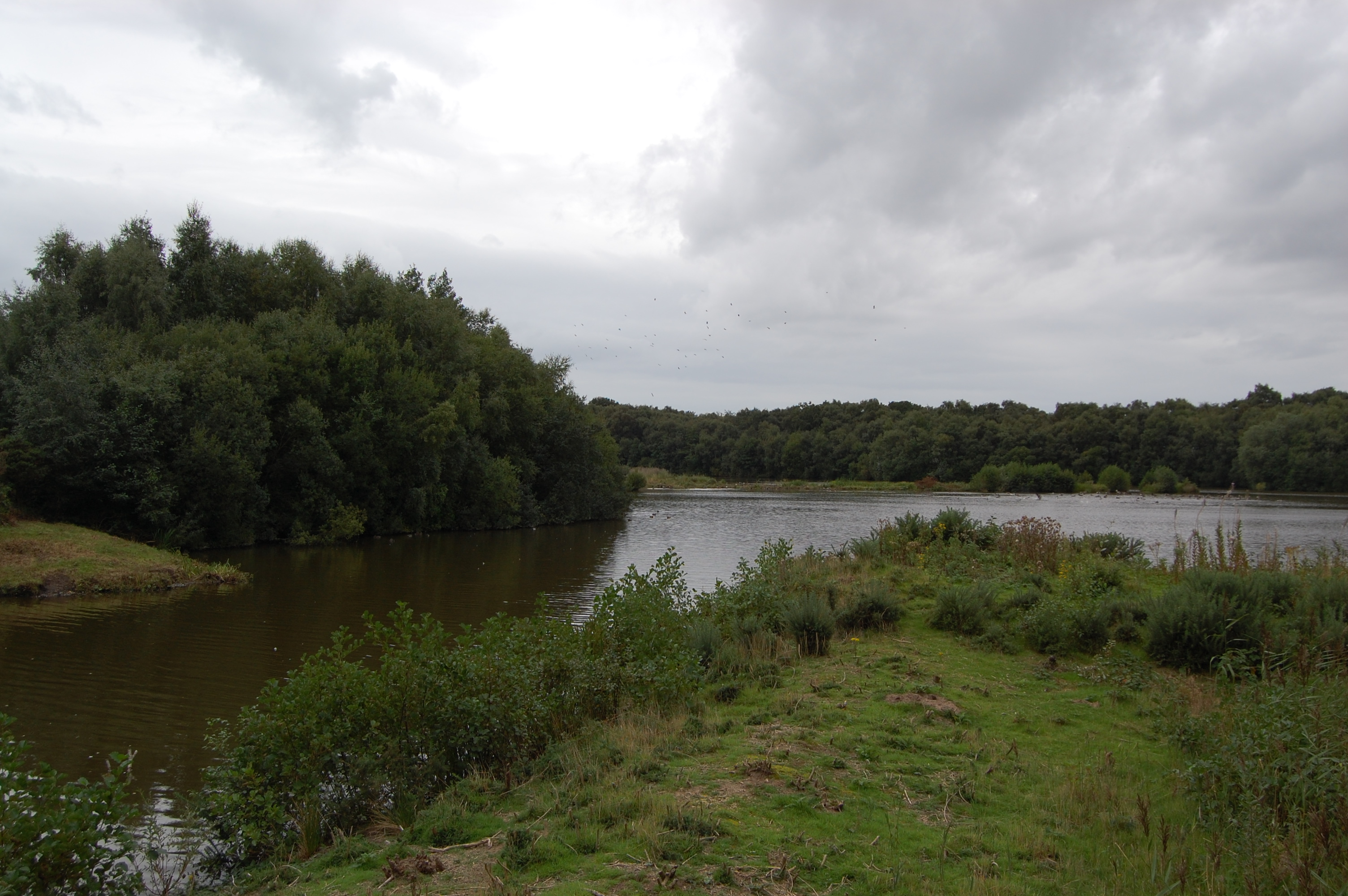
- The main lake

- Location within the Borough of West Lancashire
- Coordinates: 53.635491°N 2.83709°W
- Created: 1982
- Operator: Wildlife Trust for Lancashire, Manchester and North Merseyside
- Status: SSSI
- Website: Official site

Mere Sands Wood is a 105 acres (42 ha) nature reserve between the villages of Holmeswood and Rufford in west Lancashire, England, managed by The Wildlife Trust for Lancashire, Manchester & North Merseyside. It lies about five miles from Ormskirk. The name derives from when the area was on the shore of Martin Mere.

== Nature reserve ==
Situated near Rufford, Lancashire, the reserve comprises lakes, mature broadleaved and conifer woodland, sandy, wet meadows and heaths, standing on layers of sand and peat, deposited over boulder clay during the last ice age. It covers 105 acres (42 ha), and includes a visitors centre, two nature trails, six wildlife hides, and one viewing platform.

=== Wildlife ===
The reserve is visited by over 170 species of birds, 60 of which have bred there. There are also regular sightings of roe deer, stoats and foxes, a total of 17 species of mammals within the area including a small population of red squirrels. Fifteen species of dragonfly can be found at the reserve, ten of which have bred there. The woodland consists mainly of birch and oak trees with a Scots Pine plantation, where the red squirrels reside. There also 200 species of fungi found at Mere Sands.

== History ==
Mere Sands was originally part of the Martin Mere lake, which has Authurian links. The lake had been 15 miles (24 km) in circumference around that time. Between Anglo-saxon times and the late 1800s, the area included a fishery which stocked eels as well as fresh water fish. Between 1974 and 1982 the sand was quarried for use in glass-making. Under a planning agreement, the site was landscaped into a nature reserve once the extraction was completed. The Wildlife Trust for Lancashire, Manchester and North Merseyside acquired the site in 1982 and the reserves was designated a Site of Special Scientific Interest (SSSI) for its geological interest in 1985. Each year, tens of thousands of visitors are attracted to the site. In March 2020, one of the long standing hides, dedicated to Cyril Gibbons was burnt down in an arson attack.
