= Barton, West Lancashire =

Village in Lancashire, England

Coordinates: 53.575°N 2.977°W

Barton
- Location in West Lancashire Location within Lancashire
- OS grid reference: SD353091
  - London: 185 mi (298 km) SE
- Civil parish: Downholland
- District: West Lancashire
- Shire county: Lancashire
- Region: North West
- Country: England
- Sovereign state: United Kingdom
- Post town: ORMSKIRK
- Postcode district: L39
- Dialling code: 01704
- Police: Lancashire
- Fire: Lancashire
- Ambulance: North West
- UK Parliament: West Lancashire

Barton is a small village in the county of Lancashire, England. It is approximately 4 miles (6 km) west from Ormskirk, and less than 1 mile (2 km) west from the A5147 road. Barton sits on the West Lancashire Coastal Plain, and is 5 miles (8 km) from the Irish Sea coast. The village lies within the civil parish of Downholland.

Barton's listing in the 1086 Domesday Book shows Roger the Poitevin as lord and Tenant-in-chief. At the time Barton was in the Hundred of West Derby in the county of Cheshire.

The Manor of Barton was held by the Clifton family and, from about 1212, by the Barton family. The last Barton heiress, Fleetwood Barton (1595-1664) married into the Shuttleworth family (her first marriage to Viscount Molyneux was annulled). Her husband, Richard Shuttleworth of Gawthorpe Hall, supported the Parliamentary side in the English Civil War. The Shuttleworths held the manor until 1833, when it was sold to the Preston industrialist, George Jacson.

The village had its own Barton railway station, which opened in 1887. The line was closed completely in 1952.

== See also ==
- Listed buildings in Downholland
