= WWT Martin Mere =

Nature reserve in the United Kingdom

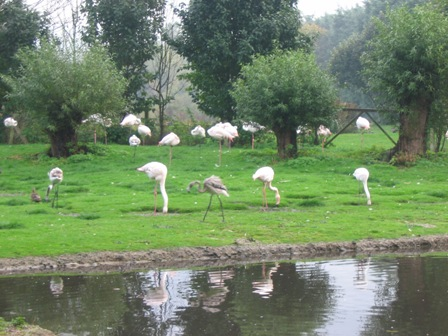
- Flamingoes at Martin Mere

- Location within the Borough of West Lancashire
- OS grid: SD425145
- Coordinates: 53.623°N 2.869°W
- Area: 600 acres (240 ha)
- Visitors: 192,443 (in 2019)

Ramsar Wetland
- Official name: Martin Mere
- Designated: 28 November 1985
- Reference no.: 324

WWT Martin Mere is a wetland nature reserve and wildfowl collection managed by the Wildfowl and Wetlands Trust at Tarlscough, Burscough, Lancashire, England, on the West Lancashire Coastal Plain, 6 miles (10 km) from Ormskirk and 10 miles (16 km) from Southport (Merseyside). It is one of ten reserves managed by the charity, and it is designated an SSSI (Site of Special Scientific Interest), an SPA (Special Protection Area) and a Ramsar Site.

The name of the centre comes from the mere on the west side of the reserve which is ringed by more than ten observation hides. On the east side of the reserve there are a number of pens providing habitats for birds from Africa, Australasia, North America, South America, Siberia, and Asia.

Martin Mere has its own "Domesday Book", listing (for 2002) nationally important species of wildlife found at the reserve, other than birds include the whorled caraway (Carum verticillatum), at its only site in England away from the southwest, and the regionally scarce water dropwort (Oenanthe fistulosa). Another sign of the sites importance for biodiversity is the recording of the first records of the micromoth, the marsh dowd (Blastobasis rebeli), for northern England.

This reserve is at its best in winter, attracting huge flocks of pink-footed geese and Eurasian wigeon, many whooper swans and occasional rarer birds such as the snow goose. It is also excellent for wintering birds of prey such as hen harrier, peregrine and merlin.

The BBC television programme Autumnwatch was broadcast live from Martin Mere in 2006 and 2007.

== History ==
Martin Mere was initially opened to members of the Wildfowl Trust in late 1974 and then in March 1975 it was opened to the general public. The reserve and centre were the concept of haulage contractor, Ronnie Barker, who was a friend of Sir Peter Scott. Barker was aware that both pink footed geese and Bewick's swans roosted at Martin Mere and was able to arrange a meeting between Sir Peter and the then landowner, this resulted in Sir Peter buying 363 acres (147 ha) for £52,000. The first warden of the reserve was Peter Gladstone (1928–2000).

== See also ==
- Burscough
- Martin Mere
