= Downholland Cross =

Village in Lancashire, England

Coordinates: 53.555°N 2.960°W

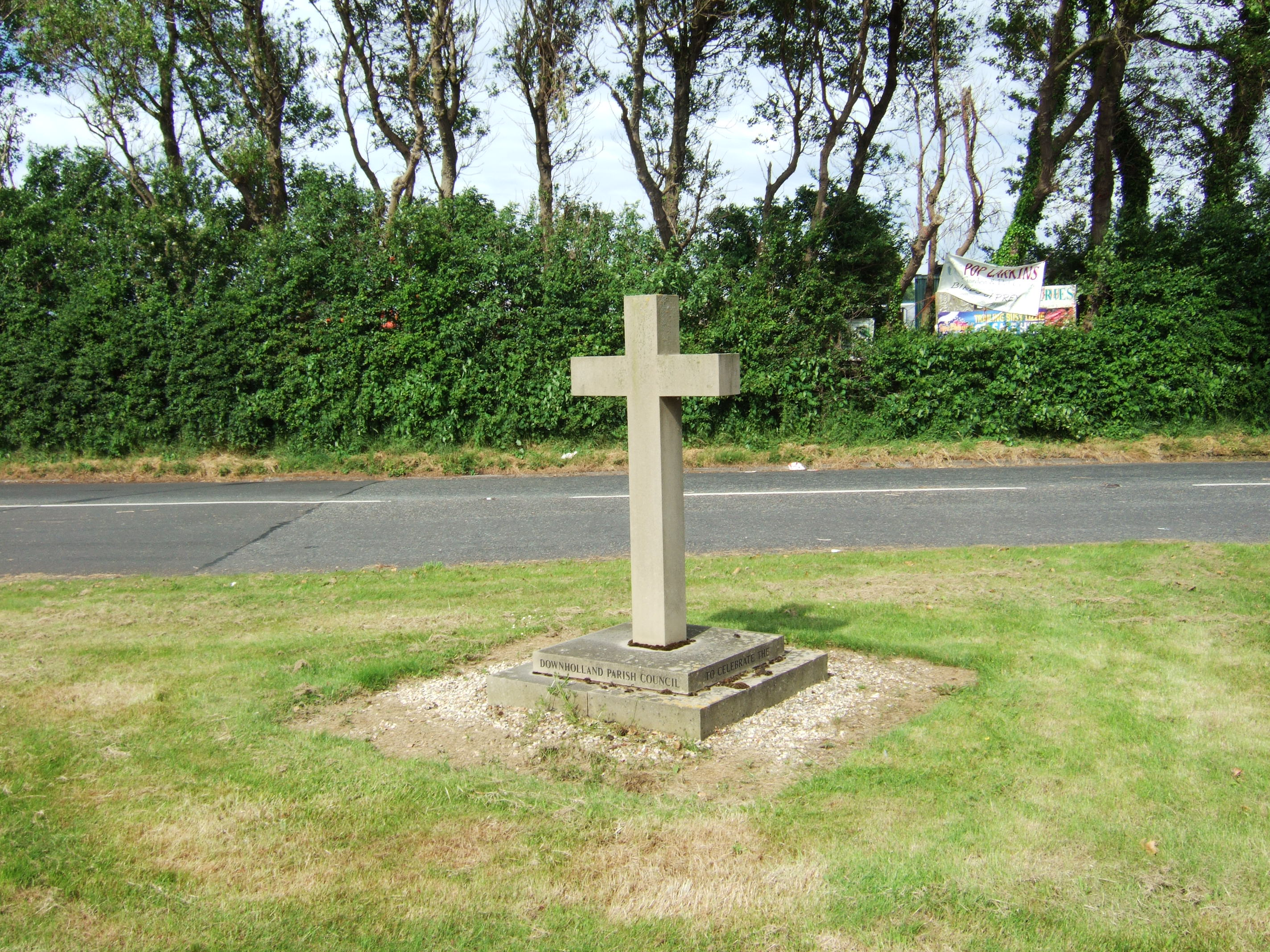
- The Downholland cross

- Location in West Lancashire Location within Lancashire
- OS grid reference: SD364069
- Civil parish: Downholland
- District: West Lancashire
- Shire county: Lancashire
- Region: North West
- Country: England
- Sovereign state: United Kingdom
- Post town: ORMSKIRK
- Postcode district: L39
- Dialling code: 0151
- Police: Lancashire
- Fire: Lancashire
- Ambulance: North West
- UK Parliament: West Lancashire

Downholland Cross is a small village in the civil parish of Downholland in the county of Lancashire on the West Lancashire Coastal Plain in England. It is to the north of Lydiate on the A5147 and the Leeds and Liverpool Canal.

The Downholland cross was reinstated by the Parish Council on the suggestion of Stephen Henders, parish councillor at the time, to mark the millennium. As 'Downholland', the village was noted in the Domesday Book.

== See also ==
- Listed buildings in Downholland
- Downholland
