= Listed buildings in Downholland =

Downholland is a civil parish in the West Lancashire district of Lancashire, England. It contains eight listed buildings that are recorded in the National Heritage List for England. All the listed buildings are designated at Grade II, the lowest of the three grades, which is applied to "buildings of national importance and special interest". The parish contains the villages of Barton, Haskayne and Downholland Cross, and is otherwise rural. The Leeds and Liverpool Canal passes through the parish. Two milestones by the towpath of the canal are listed, and the other listed buildings are houses and associated structures.

== Buildings ==
Name and location	Photograph	Date	Notes
107 School Lane; 53.56214°N 2.96922°W	—	17th century (probable)	A cruck-framed house with walls of brick and stone and a thatched roof. It is in a single storey and has five windows with plain reveals on the front. Inside the house parts of four cruck trusses are visible.
Downholland Hall; 53.55779°N 2.96675°W		17th century	A house mainly in brick with some sandstone and with a slate roof. It has two storeys and three bays. Most of the windows are mullioned with plastered surrounds, and there is one sash window. The doorway has a chamfered surround and a canted head, and there is a finial on the right gable.
Stock Cottage; 53.56575°N 2.96936°W		Late 17th century (probable)	A house with an attached farm building to the left, now integrated into the house. The building is partly in brick, partly rendered, and partly in stone, and roof is thatched. The house has one storey and an attic. The doorways and windows have plain reveals, and there are eyebrow dormers in the upper storey. Outside the former farm building are steps leading to a first-floor doorway. Inside the house is an inglenook.
Owens Farmhouse; 53.55380°N 2.95470°W	—	1677	The house has a lower storey in sandstone with brick above and a slate roof. There is a two-storey gabled porch, with two bays to the left and one to the right. The outer porch doorway is round-headed with an inscribed keystone. The windows have plain reveals and contain 20th-century casements. Inside the house is a bressumer.
153 School Lane; 53.55967°N 2.96971°W		c. 1800	The cottage contains fabric remaining from the 17th century. It is partly in painted stone and partly stuccoed and has a thatched roof. There is one storey, the windows are 20th-century casements, and the doorway has plain reveals. On the right gable wall is a lean-to porch. Inside the house is one full and one part cruck truss.
Mounting steps 53.57371°N 2.97504°W	—	Early 19th century (or earlier)	The mounting steps are built against the boundary wall of No. 116 Station Road. They are in sandstone and consists of five steps with a massive platform formed by a flagstone.
Milestone; 53.55065°N 2.95384°W	—	19th century	The milestone is by the towpath of the Leeds and Liverpool Canal. It is in cast iron and has a triangular plan. The plates are inscribed with the distances in miles to Liverpool and to Leeds.
Milestone; 53.56170°N 2.96817°W	—	19th century	The milestone is by the towpath of the Leeds and Liverpool Canal. It is in cast iron and has a triangular plan. The plates are inscribed with the distances in miles to Liverpool and to Leeds.
