= Rufford New Hall =

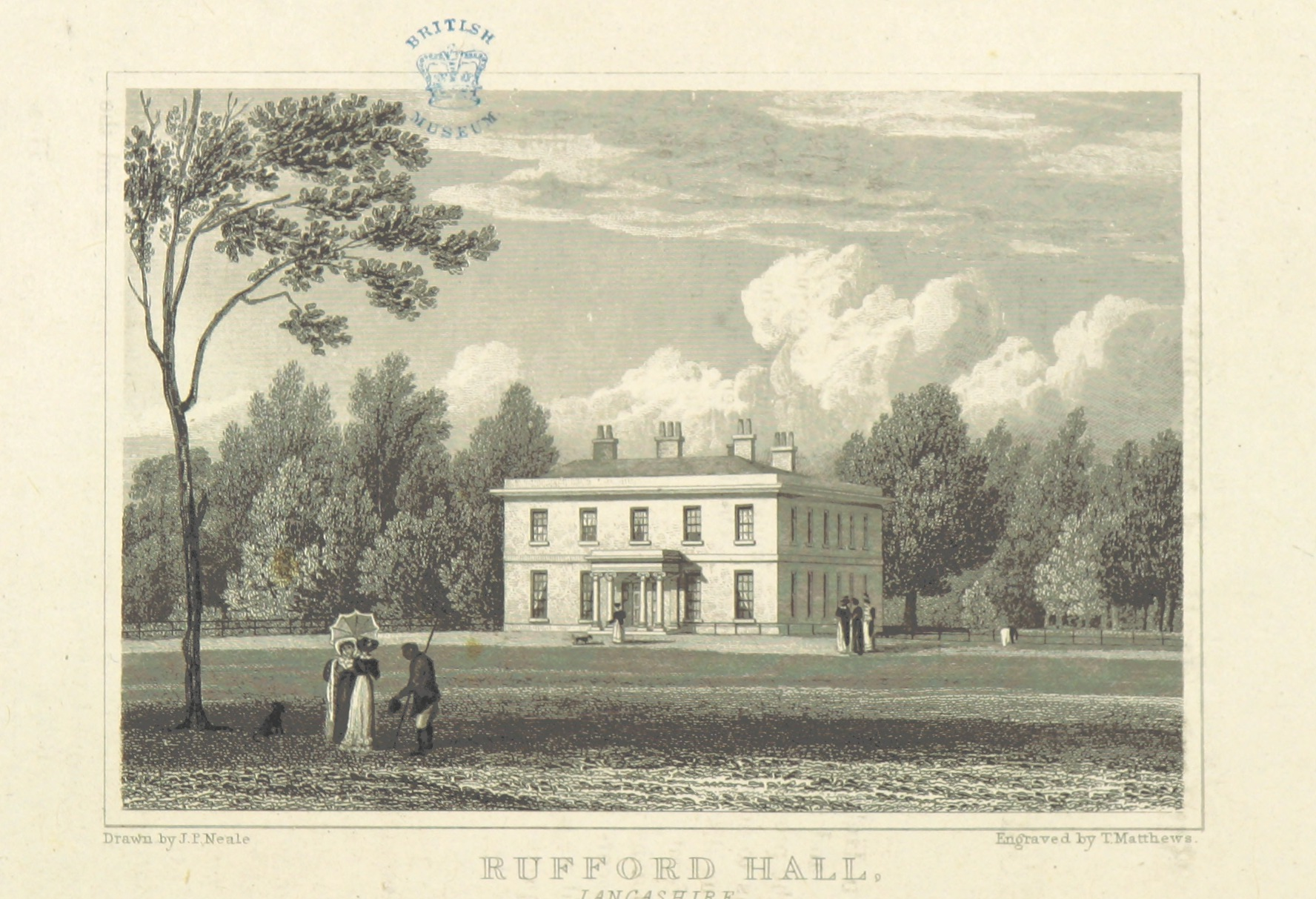
- Rufford New Hall in 1818

- Location within the Borough of West Lancashire

General information
- Architectural style: Georgian
- Location: Rufford, England
- Coordinates: 53.6409°N 2.8242°W
- Completed: 1798
- Client: Robert Hesketh

Technical details
- Structural system: Brick with stucco

Listed Building – Grade II
- Designated: 2 December 1986
- Reference no.: 1361855

Rufford New Hall is a former country house that belonged to the Heskeths who were lords of the manor of Rufford, Lancashire, England. It replaced Rufford Old Hall as their residence in 1760. From 1920 to 1987 it was used as a hospital and has subsequently been restored and converted for residential use. It was designated a Grade II listed building in 1986.

== History ==
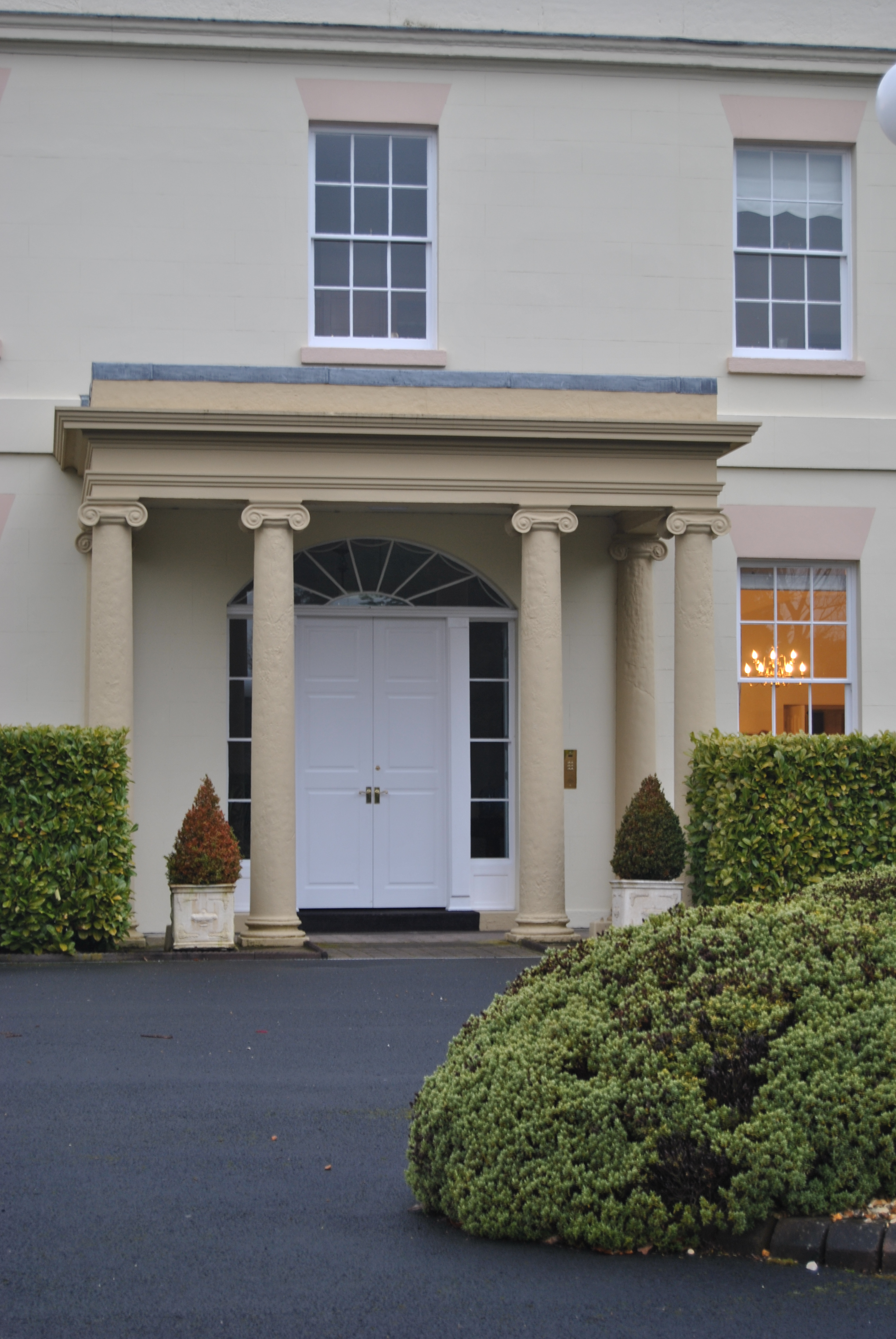
The portico entrance in 2010.

Rufford New Hall was built in 1760. The country house was built by Sir Robert Hesketh and enlarged by his grandson around 1798-9 when the Heskeths left Rufford Old Hall. Heskeths lived at Rufford New Hall until 1919.

The hall is built in brick which was formerly stuccoed. It has a low-pitched hipped slate roof concealed by a low parapet. The two storey symmetrical frontage has a five-bay facade with an Ionic portico of unfluted columns over a wide doorway with a fanlight. The hall has four 15-paned sashed windows on the ground floor, with five 12-paned windows on the first. Some spout heads bear the initials of Sir Thomas Dalrymple Hesketh and the date 1811 and one is dated 1822. The entrance hall has a cantilevered or flying stone staircase and landing on three sides with wrought iron balusters and is lighted by a domed oval skylight. The main hall has columns and pilasters made from Scagliola marble.

=== Hospital ===
Rufford New Hall was bought by Lancashire County Council in 1920 and converted for use as a hospital. Rufford Pulmonary Hospital opened on 6 August 1926. It had 50 beds to treat patients with tuberculosis. Subsequently, it was used by the NHS as a pre-convalescent hospital until its closure in 1987. The convalescent hospital was administered by Ormskirk District General Hospital.

== Rufford Park ==
The Heskeths created Rufford Park around the hall, with a deer park, a ha-ha, and leisure gardens surrounded by a stone wall. Rufford Park extended from the boundary with Holmeswood to the boundary with Croston and Mawdesley. The area was divided by the Liverpool-Preston Turnpike Road (the A59 Liverpool Road). The development of the park resulted in cottages being demolished and their inhabitants relocated in the village. The park is screened by trees and contains an ice house, a rose garden, a restored ornamental garden, lake, and plantations. The southern part of the park is designated a Biological Heritage Site, and is home to bats, red squirrels and other species of animals, shrubs and rare fungi.

=== Ice house ===
The ice house is a Grade II listed building, one of three survivors in the district. The building was renovated when the main hall was restored and is protected and maintained by the estate. It is circular, built in sandstone, brick and earth with a domed roof above an underground chamber entered through a brick passage. Surrounding the ice house is a ha-ha forming a complete circle about 35 metres (115 ft) in diameter. In winter ice was taken from the frozen lake to the ice house for storage for the rest of the year.

=== Lodges ===
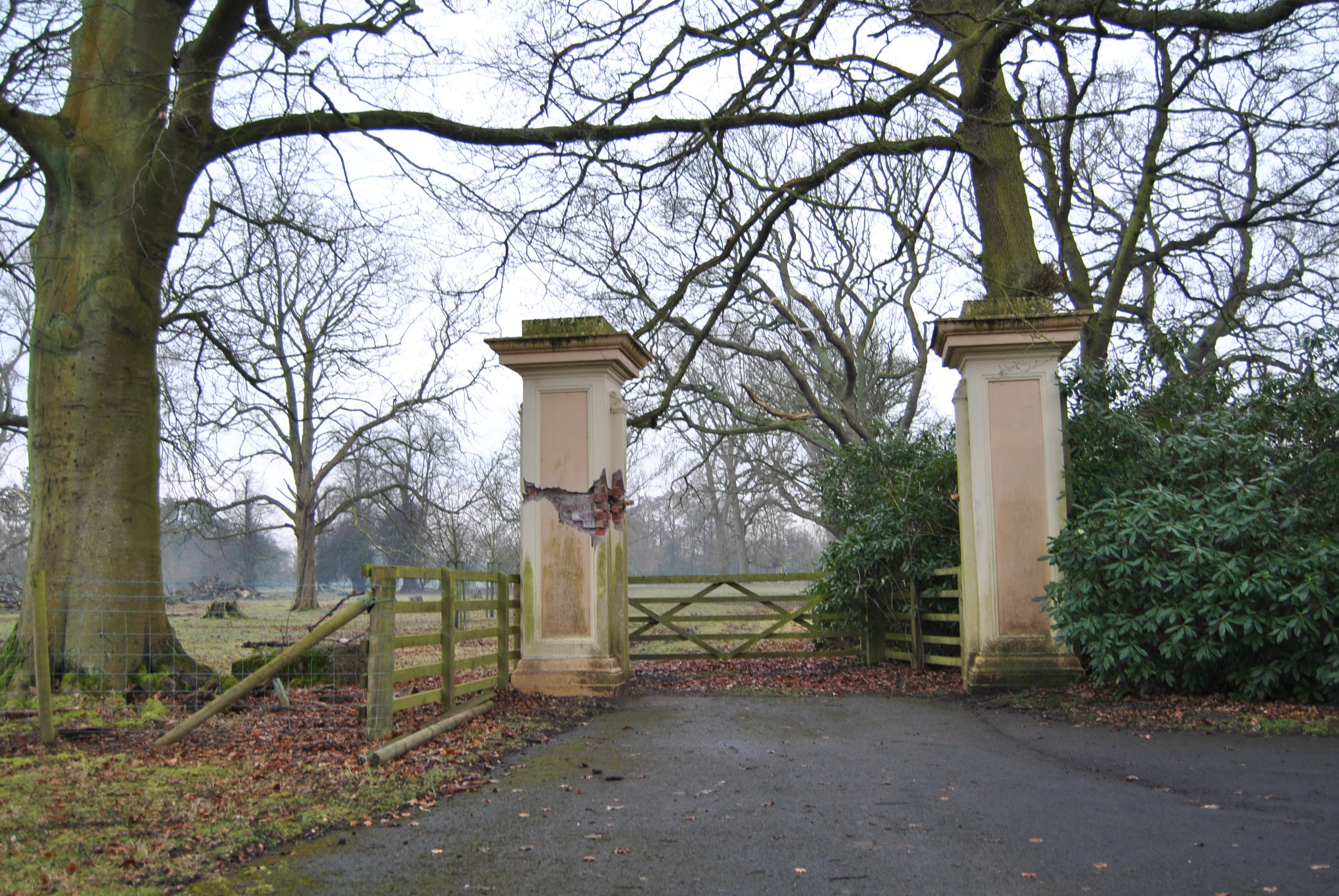
Gate posts at Rufford New Hall in 2010.

Rufford New Hall had three lodges, which can be seen on the 1847 Ordnance Survey map. Holmeswood Lodge was constructed in the early 19th century on Holmeswood Road. Hesketh Lodge was constructed in the early 19th century as the main entrance lodge. It was named after the original owners. It is a single storey building and is stuccoed with stone dressings. Croston Lodge is the north entrance lodge on the A59, Liverpool Road, built in 1798. It is a single storey brick building with a slate roof. Springwood Lodge is the former gamekeeper or gardener's cottage.

== Restoration ==
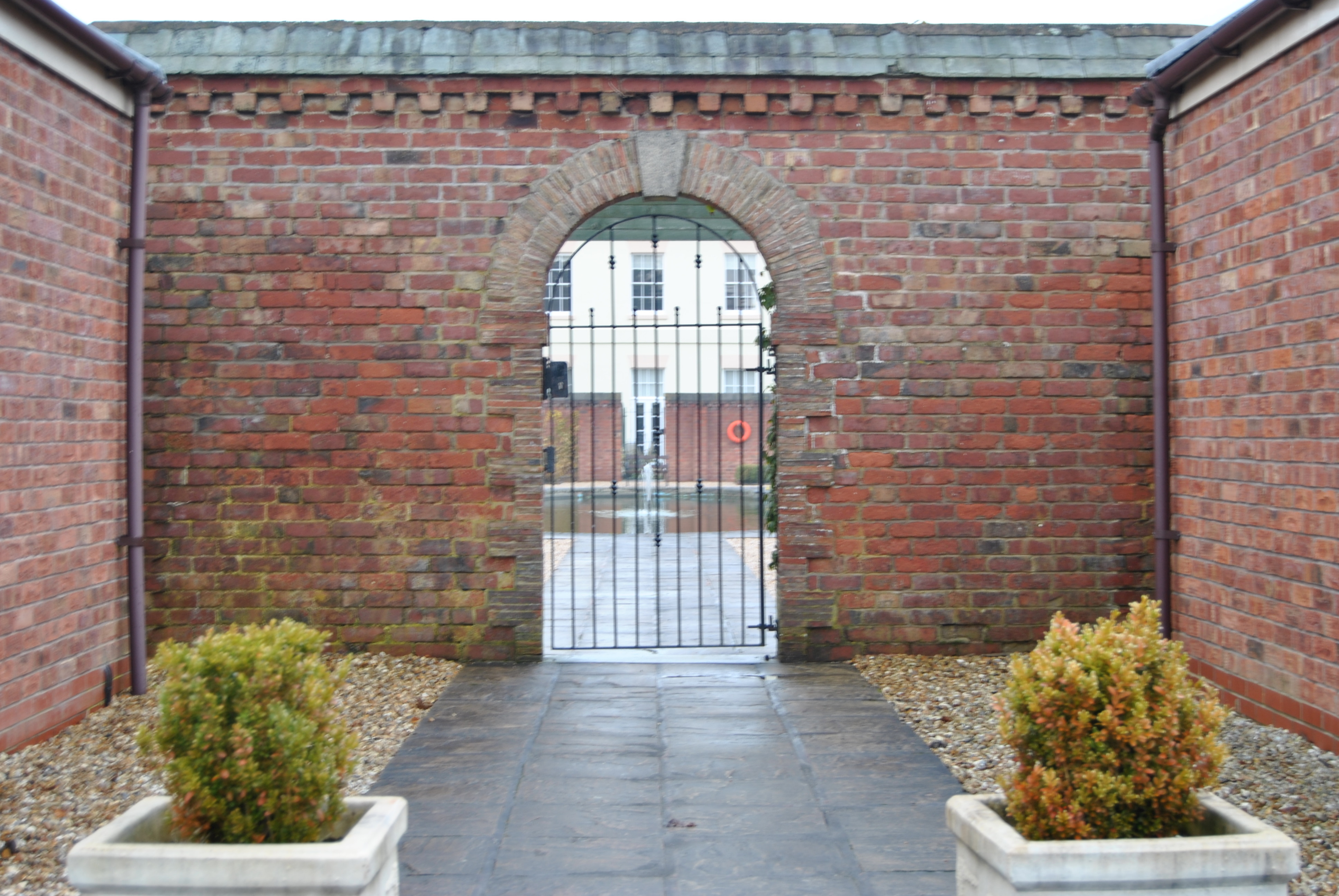
Restored garden doorway in 2010.

The hall and north wing were restored and converted into apartments and mews houses. The stone cantilevered staircase with the Hesketh family crest, the Georgian belvedere tower and the oval glass dome on the roof have been retained. The hall retains its Ionic colonnades and portico. The stable block has been converted to mews cottages. The formal gardens, ornamental ponds, lawns and tennis courts have been restored. The majority of trees around the hall are protected by a Tree Preservation Order and include many species, the rarest being a handkerchief tree.

== Ghosts ==
The hall and its grounds are reputed to be haunted by four different ghosts.

== See also ==
- Listed buildings in Rufford, Lancashire
