= Thomas Fleetwood (1661–1717) =

- Born: 1661
- Died: 1717 (aged 55–56)

Thomas Fleetwood (1661–1717) was a British landowner, and drainer of Martin Mere.

== Life ==
He was born in 1661, the eldest son of Sir Thomas Fleetwood, 4th Baronet, of Calwick, who survived him. He married Anne Banastre, the daughter and heiress of Christopher Banastre of Bank Hall, Lancashire, he purchased from the Mainwarings, about 1690, the manor of Marton Grange, or Marton Sands, in the same county.

His land adjoined a large lake called Martin Mere, occupying an area of 3,132 acres, with a circumference of about eighteen miles which he resolved to drain. Having first obtained from the neighbouring landowners a lease of their rights in the mere for the duration of three lifetimes and 31 years, he obtained an act of parliament in 1692 and began work the following year. Up to 2,000 labourers were engaged at any one time.

The result was successful for about 60 years, but in 1755, five years after the lease had expired, the sea broke in, almost destroying all that had been done. In 1781, draining operations were resumed by Thomas Eccleston of Scarisbrick but it was not until after the middle of the 19th century that Sir Peter Hesketh succeeded in converting the tract of fertile land to profitable use.

Fleetwood died 22 April 1717, and was buried at St Cuthbert's Church, Churchtown, where there is a monument to his memory eulogising his enterprise and spirit. His only daughter and heiress, Henrietta Maria Fleetwood, married Thomas Legh, younger brother of Peter Legh of Lyme in Cheshire.
