= Tarlscough =

Hamlet in Lancashire, England

Coordinates: 53.620°N 2.855°W

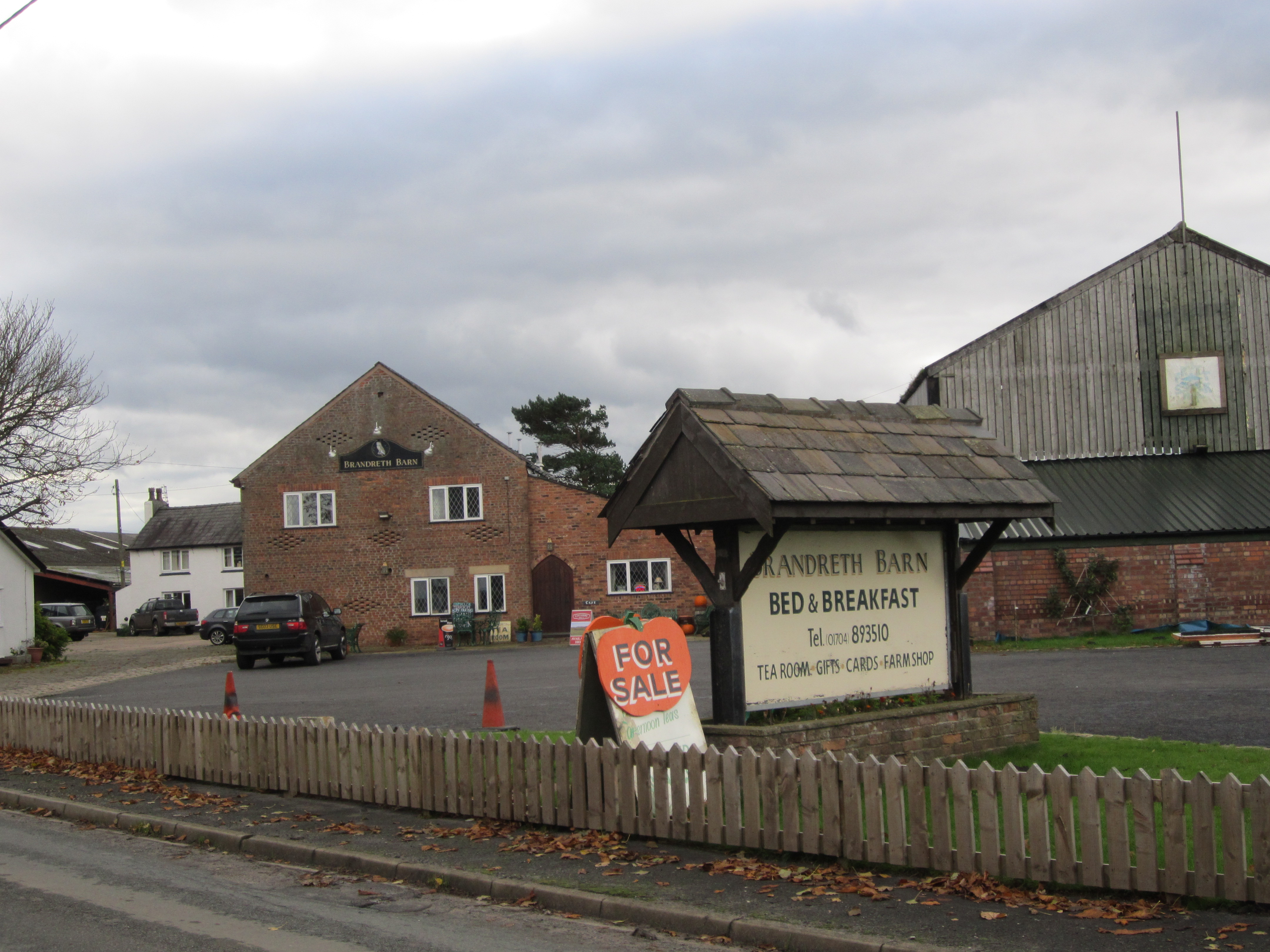
- Brandreth Barn bed and breakfast

- Location in West Lancashire Location within Lancashire
- OS grid reference: SD434140
- Civil parish: Burscough
- District: West Lancashire
- Shire county: Lancashire
- Region: North West
- Country: England
- Sovereign state: United Kingdom
- Post town: ORMSKIRK
- Postcode district: L40
- Dialling code: 01704
- Police: Lancashire
- Fire: Lancashire
- Ambulance: North West
- UK Parliament: West Lancashire

Tarlscough (/ˈtɑːrlzkoʊ/) is a hamlet in the West Lancashire district, in the English county of Lancashire. It is roughly 1 3/4 miles (2.8 km) (by road) north of the centre of Burscough.

== Environment ==
The main feature of the hamlet is Martin Mere Wetland Centre, which is a major attraction for the North West of England as it is a site of special scientific interest, a special protection area and a Ramsar site.

== Transport ==
The nearest train station is New Lane railway station which is a 1-mile walk south from Martin Mere. There are three roads running through the hamlet, Fish Lane to the north west, Tarlscough Lane to the south east and Marsh Moss Lane to the south.
