= Rufford, Lancashire =

Village in West Lancashire, England

Coordinates: 53.633°N 2.819°W

Rufford
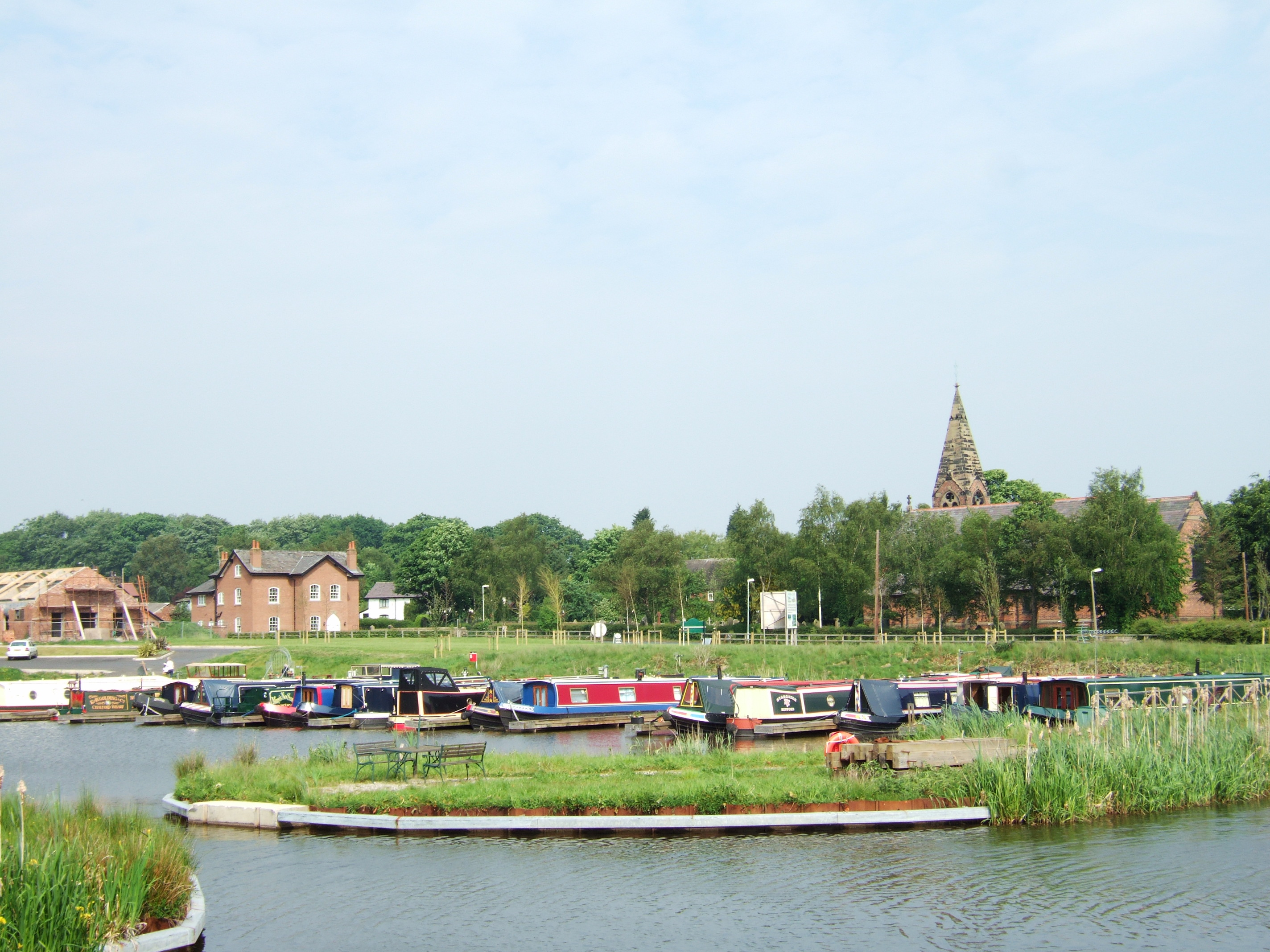
- View across St Mary's Marina towards the Parish Church of St Mary the Virgin

- Location in West Lancashire Location within Lancashire
- Population: 2,161 (2021)
- OS grid reference: SD458155
- Civil parish: Rufford
- District: West Lancashire
- Shire county: Lancashire
- Region: North West
- Country: England
- Sovereign state: United Kingdom
- Post town: ORMSKIRK
- Postcode district: L40
- Dialling code: 01704
- Police: Lancashire
- Fire: Lancashire
- Ambulance: North West
- UK Parliament: Southport

Rufford is a village in West Lancashire, England, where the Leeds and Liverpool Canal, Liverpool, Ormskirk and Preston Railway, the A59 and the River Douglas meet.

Rufford is also a civil parish, which includes the neighbouring village of Holmeswood, and in 2021 it had a population of 2,161.

== History ==
Rufford's name derives from the Old English rūh and ford, the rough ford. It was a crossing place over the River Douglas. Rufford was recorded as Ruchford in 1212, Rufford in 1285, Roughford in 1318, Rughford in 1332 and Roghforth in 1411.

Part of the manor was granted by Richard Bussel, baron of Penwortham to Richard Fitton in the reign of Henry I. In 1278 his descendant and heiress Dame Maude Fitton married Sir William Hesketh. Sir William's grandson married the daughter of Edmund Fitton, who owned the other moiety of the manor which then descended with the Heskeths.

In 1339 Sir William Hesketh was granted a charter for a weekly market and annual fair. He fought at the Battle of Crécy in 1346, and was knight of the shire in 1360.

In the late 15th century the Heskeths built Rufford Hall. It was altered in 1661 and redeveloped in the 1820s. The family built Rufford New Hall in 1760 and enlarged it around 1798–99 when the family left the old hall for the new.

== Governance ==
Rufford was a chapelry in the parish of Croston from which it was separated by act of parliament and became a parish in 1793. It was part of the Leyland hundred and after 1837 became part of the Ormskirk Poor Law Union which built a workhouse and took responsibility for the poor in that area.

Rufford is a ward in the borough of West Lancashire, and elects one member to the council. It also has a parish council that meets in the village hall. On Lancashire County Council, Rufford is combined with Burscough and Scarisbrick for the West Lancashire West ward.

== Geography ==
Rufford is 5½ miles north east of Ormskirk and covers 2,996 acres of mostly flat land which rises slightly towards Holmeswood in the north. The soil is loam over sand and much of the land is used for arable farming or pasture. The Leeds and Liverpool Canal and the railway between Liverpool and Preston pass through the township and the River Douglas separates it from Croston.

Mere Sands Wood Nature Reserve, managed by the Wildlife Trust for Lancashire, Manchester and North Merseyside is a situated to the northwest. In medieval times this area was on the edge of Martin Mere and was drained by the Heskeths. Sand from this area was used for glass-making and extraction companies quarried the site between 1974 and 1982 after which it was restored as a nature reserve. The reserve is a Site of Special Scientific Interest, (SSSI), because of its geological features and a Lancashire Biological Heritage Site.

== Population ==
Population in Rufford from 1801–1961

Year	Pop.	±% p.a.
1801	853	—
1811	998	+1.58%
1821	1,073	+0.73%
1831	869	−2.09%
1841	866	−0.03%

Year	Pop.	±% p.a.
1851	861	−0.06%
1881	905	+0.17%
1891	816	−1.03%
1901	782	−0.42%
1911	794	+0.15%

Year	Pop.	±% p.a.
1921	765	−0.37%
1931	922	+1.88%
1951	1,130	+1.02%
1961	1,427	+2.36%

Source: Rufford CP/Ch/AP

== Economy ==
The village is largely rural with little or no industry. The farmland is grade one agricultural land. In the early 20th century the village was described as "one of the prettiest in South Lancashire" and was a destination for day trips from neighbouring towns. Tourism began in Victorian times and today visitors are attracted by the National Trust property Rufford Old Hall, Mere Sands nature reserve and the marinas on the canal. There are tea shops and cafes in the village, a public house, the Hesketh Arms, and a hotel and restaurant, the Rufford Arms on the outskirts of the village.

== Transport ==
Rufford lies on the A59 road linking it with Southport, Ormskirk, Preston and Liverpool. The nearest motorway is the M6 at Parbold. The Liverpool, Ormskirk and Preston Railway constructed its line through the village between 1847 and 1849, and Rufford railway station opened on 2 April 1849. The Rufford Branch of the Leeds and Liverpool Canal runs through the village to the east of Rufford Old Hall and there are two marinas, Fettlers Wharf and St Mary's which provide moorings. St Mary's Marina has a dry dock for repairs.

== Landmarks ==
Rufford's two halls lie within a conservation area. Rufford Old Hall has belonged to the National Trust since 1936. It was home to the Hesketh family for over four hundred years until Rufford New Hall in Rufford Park was built. New Hall was bought by Lancashire County Council in 1920 and in 1926 it became a pulmonary hospital for the treatment of tuberculosis.

Another landmark is the parish church built in 1869. The red brick Church of St Mary the Virgin, built in the Gothic style with a steeple, is a Grade II Listed building. The three-storey Hesketh Arms was probably built in the late 18th century of scored stucco on brick with low-pitched slate roof. The inn is painted white with stone quoins. The old inn is a Grade II listed building. The Rufford Branch of the Leeds and Liverpool Canal passes on the east side.

== Religion ==
A chapel was founded before 1346 when Sir Robert Hesketh was licensed to found a chantry. The chapel was rebuilt in 1735. It was a plain brick building with a bell cupola. A gallery and an organ were installed in 1829. The chapel was replaced in 1869 by the present church dedicated to St Mary the Virgin, built of red brick and stone in the Gothic style.

There is a Wesleyan Methodist church on Brick Kiln Lane, which was founded before 1893.

== See also ==
- Listed buildings in Rufford, Lancashire
- Rufford, Nottinghamshire
