= Duke of Devonshire (apple) =

Apple cultivar

- Genus: Malus
- Species: domestica
- Origin: Lancashire

Duke of Devonshire is an apple cultivar originating from Lancashire.

== Description ==
This is a medium-sized (69 x 56 mm), roundish-ovate apple with a slight brownish flush. Its surface is veined with russet. The stalk is extremely short and stout. It was raised at Holker Hall, Lancashire in 1835, and introduced in 1875. It is picked in October.
