= Lord Suffield (apple) =

British cooking apple variety

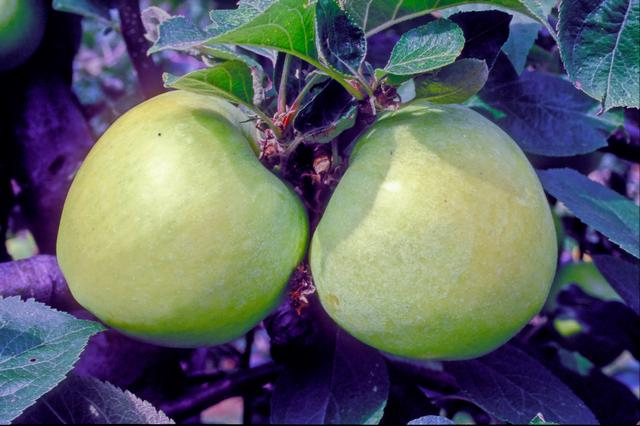
A pair of Lord Suffield apples on a tree

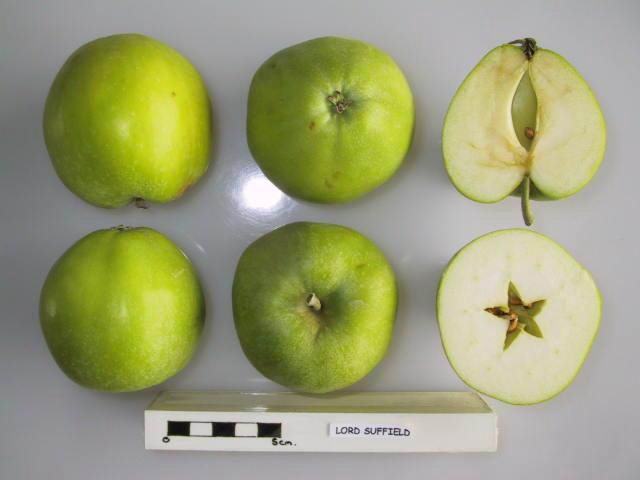
A cross section of a Lord Suffield apple, from the National Fruit Collection

Lord Suffield is a very large conical (height 76–83 mm, width 69–85 mm) cooking apple, raised by Thomas Thorpe, from Manchester, United Kingdom. It has been known since 1836. The apple has medium to strong ribbing, and a stalk of approx. 12×4.8 mm. The skin is green, with no flush, and the flesh is white and cooks well. It has a wide and deep cavity and around 1–7 pips. The tree is rather small. The apple is picked in late August and can be used from August to November. The parentage is a Peasgood Nonsuch x unknown. It was given the Award of Merit from the Royal Horticultural Society in 1904 and a First Class Certificate from the RHS in 1910. It is susceptible to apple canker.
