= Holmeswood =

Village in Lancashire, England

Coordinates: 53.644°N 2.861°W

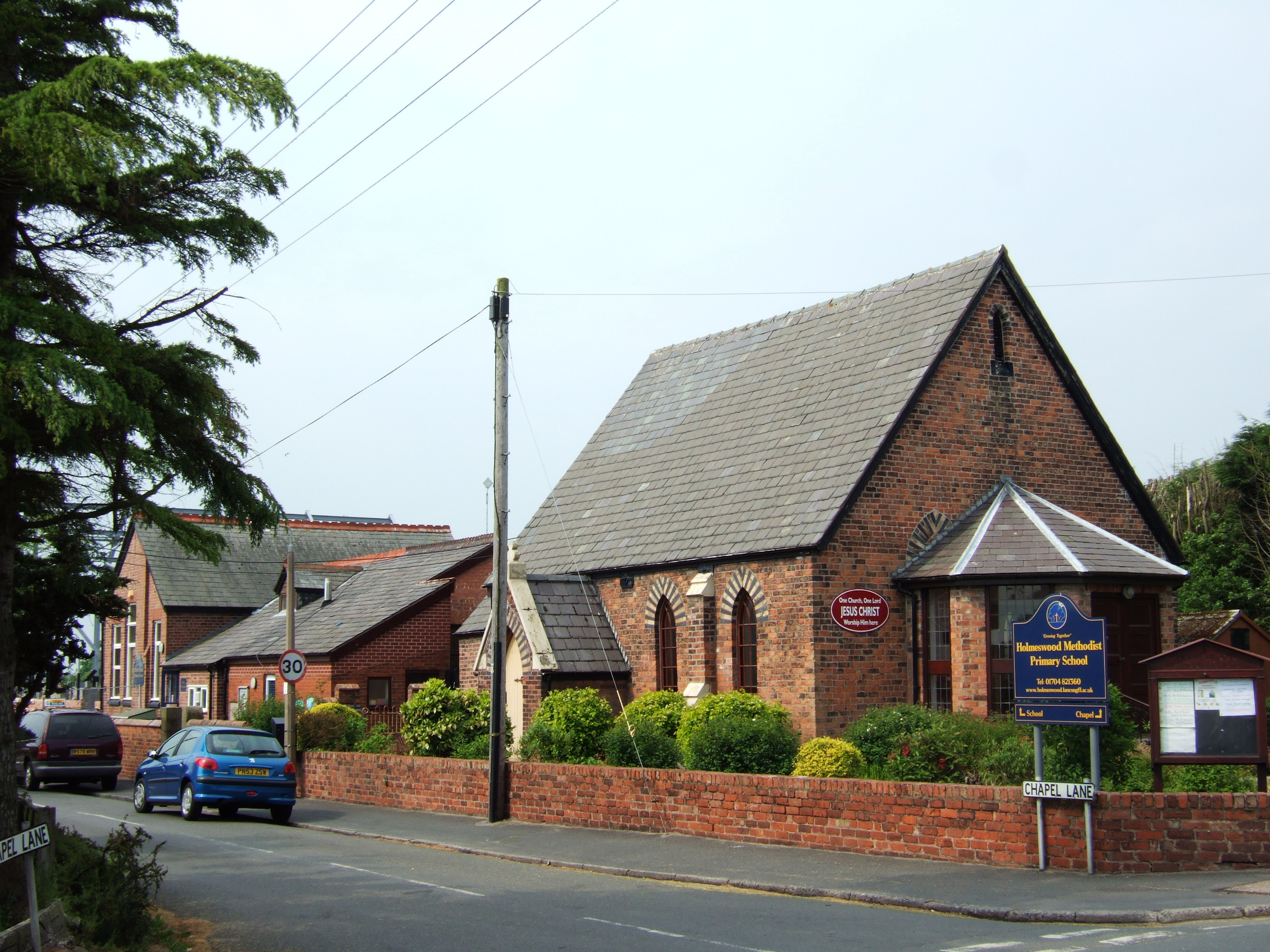
- Holmeswood Methodist church and school

- Location in West Lancashire Location within Lancashire
- OS grid reference: SD430167
- Civil parish: Rufford
- District: West Lancashire
- Shire county: Lancashire
- Region: North West
- Country: England
- Sovereign state: United Kingdom
- Post town: Ormskirk
- Postcode district: L40
- Dialling code: 01704
- Police: Lancashire
- Fire: Lancashire
- Ambulance: North West
- UK Parliament: South Ribble

Holmeswood is a small agricultural village in West Lancashire, in the north-west of England. It lies just north of the Martin Mere Wetland Centre and to the south of North Meols about six miles east of the Irish Sea coast at Southport.

The village's position on the West Lancashire Coastal Plain lends it very fertile soil; unsurprisingly, agriculture (primarily of vegetables, though also some grain) is the economic mainstay of the village. Some smaller-scale pastoral farming is also seen, too.

In contrast to the more northerly villages around Banks, Holmeswood has remained largely undeveloped, although it is conveniently placed for commuting to the nearby towns of Southport, Preston, Burscough and Ormskirk. For local matters, the village falls under Rufford Parish Council.

The village lies almost wholly on the B5246, which runs from Mere Brow to Rufford.

As befits an agricultural village of its size, Holmeswood has a small village hall, Methodist primary school and a bowling and tennis club.

== Architecture ==
Holmeswood Hall stands among the dark woods between the villages of Mere Brow and Holmeswood. Thomas Hesketh, son of Nicholas Hesketh, was born at Holmeswood Hall in 1406. The present Holmeswood Hall was built in 1568 which is the date given on the 1847 Ordnance Survey map at Lancashire Records Office. This makes the building a grade II listed building. The Hesketh family being the owners of Rufford Old Hall, re-built the present hall as a hunting lodge. The rise or 'brow' in approaching the hall is the ancient bank of Martin Mere. It can be seen today as a wood between Mere Brow and the hall itself the road is the ridge of the bank.
