= West Lancashire Coastal Plain =

Geographical region in North-West England

Coordinates: 53.613°N 2.991°W

The West Lancashire Coastal Plain is a substantial area of land in the south west of Lancashire, England. It was formed after the Devensian glaciation, when glaciers retreated from the area around 12,000 years ago, leaving behind a flat, low-lying area of land between the Ribble and Mersey estuaries. The glaciers retreated, releasing glacial drift across the landscape, producing depressions and wetlands that gradually developed into the plain we see today.

The plain stretches from the Rimrose Valley in Seaforth, near Liverpool on the Mersey, to the south, to Preston on the Ribble, to the north. To the east, the plain is bounded by the foothills of the Pennines, while the western edge of the plain is separated from the sea by sand dunes. It is very flat, and much of it is only a few metres above sea level.

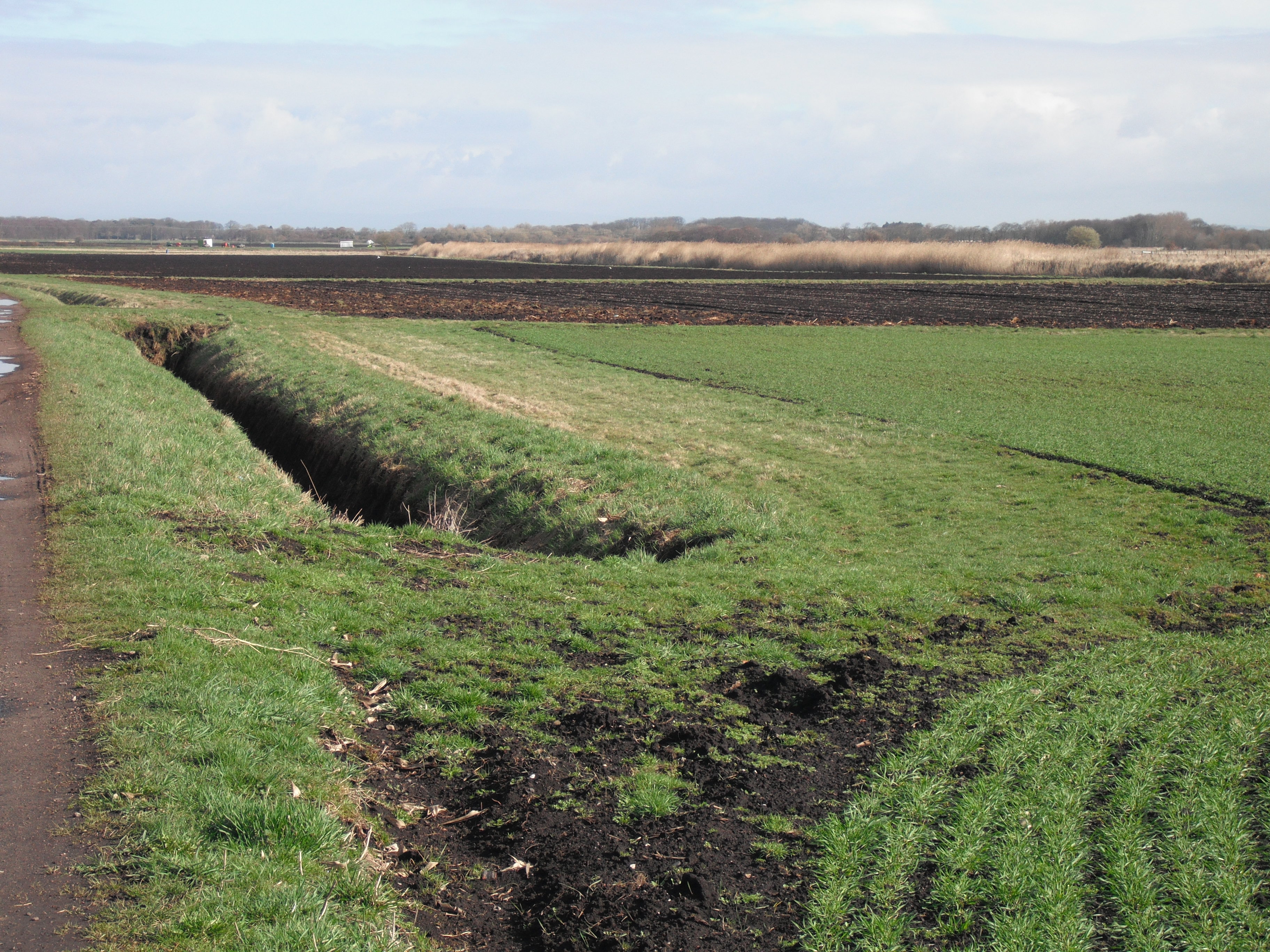
Countryside near Martin Mere

The area has been inhabited since the Mesolithic, with the Brigantes, Vikings, and Romans having lived on the West Lancashire Coastal plain since. Much of the land throughout time was made up of vast, peaty marshland surrounding the large glacial lake, Martin Mere.

WWT Martin Mere, found just outside of the town of Burscough, gives a glimpse into how the surrounding area and its habitats may have looked prior to its initial drainage. Before the first draining of the mere, it was the largest lake in England. Mitchell (1885) provides a detailed map of the area depicting the extent of floodwater in the winter of 1848. The area of floodwater was found to be 7.6 square miles, considerably more than Windermere at the time. This suggests the mere must have been even larger before its draining in 1697.

The majority of the land that makes up this plain has now been reclaimed for agriculture, thanks to the fertile soils from the previous marshland. This farmland is some of the most productive in the North West, crops grown here include Wheat, potatoes, carrots, cabbages, brussels sprouts, and onions. Much of the farmland is characterised by rectangular fields of dark peaty soil with deep drainage ditches. It is common to find the suffix "Moss" in the names of local places, such as Moss Lane, Woodmoss Lane and Marsh Moss Lane. As is usual in these types of areas, the settlements tend to be on any available hill, many formed by sandstone outcrops.

The main market town for this area is Ormskirk. The Leeds and Liverpool Canal crosses the plain and, in summer, is used for irrigation, bringing in water from the Pennines. The Trans Pennine Trail starts in Southport. It crosses the plain following the Southport & Cheshire Lines Extension Railway to Aintree, before continuing towards Manchester and Hull. The historic Lathom House was built upon the plain.
