= List of works by James Thurber =

This is a list of works by James Thurber.

== Books ==
- Is Sex Necessary? Or, Why You Feel the Way You Do (1929 with E. B. White),

75th anniv. edition (2004) with foreword by John Updike, ISBN 0-06-073314-4

- The Owl in the Attic and Other Perplexities, 1931
- The Seal in the Bedroom and Other Predicaments, 1932
- My Life and Hard Times, 1933, ISBN 0-06-093308-9
- The Middle-Aged Man on the Flying Trapeze, 1935
- Let Your Mind Alone! and Other More or Less Inspirational Pieces, 1937
- The Last Flower, 1939, reissued 2007, ISBN 978-1-58729-620-8
- Fables for Our Time and Famous Poems Illustrated, 1940, ISBN 0-06-090999-4
- My World—And Welcome to It, 1942, ISBN 0-15-662344-7
- Men, Women and Dogs, 1943
- The Thurber Carnival (anthology), 1945, ISBN 0-06-093287-2,

ISBN 0-394-60085-1 (Modern Library Edition)

- The Beast in Me and Other Animals, 1948, ISBN 0-15-610850-X
- The Thurber Album, 1952
- Thurber Country, 1953
- Thurber's Dogs, 1955
- Further Fables for Our Time, 1956
- Alarms and Diversions (anthology), 1957
- The Years with Ross, 1959, ISBN 0-06-095971-1
- Lanterns and Lances, 1961

=== Children's books ===
- Many Moons, 1943
- The Great Quillow, 1944
- The White Deer, 1945
- The 13 Clocks, 1950
- The Wonderful O, 1957

=== Plays ===
- The Male Animal, 1940 (with Elliott Nugent)
- A Thurber Carnival, 1960

=== Posthumous books ===
- Credos and Curios, 1962 (ed. Helen W. Thurber)
- Thurber & Company, 1966 (ed. Helen W. Thurber)
- Selected Letters of James Thurber, 1981 (ed. Helen W. Thurber & Edward Weeks) ISBN 978-0-316844-44-4
- Collecting Himself: James Thurber on Writing and Writers, Humor and Himself, 1989 (ed. Michael J. Rosen)
- Thurber on Crime, 1991 (ed. Robert Lopresti) ISBN 978-0-892964-50-5
- People Have More Fun Than Anybody: A Centennial Celebration of Drawings and Writings by James Thurber, 1994 (ed. Michael J. Rosen) ISBN 978-0-151000-94-4
- James Thurber: Writings and Drawings (anthology), 1996, (ed. Garrison Keillor), Library of America, ISBN 978-1-883011-22-2
- The Dog Department: James Thurber on Hounds, Scotties, and Talking Poodles, 2001 (ed. Michael J. Rosen) ISBN 978-0-060196-56-1
- The Thurber Letters: The Wit, Wisdom, and Surprising Life of James Thurber, 2002 (ed. Harrison Kinney, with Rosemary A. Thurber) ISBN 978-0-743223-43-0
- Collected Fables, 2019 (ed. Michael J. Rosen), ISBN
- A Mile and a Half of Lines: The Art of James Thurber, 2019 (ed. Michael J. Rosen) ISBN 978-0814255339

== Short stories ==
- “A Box to Hide In”
- "The Admiral on the Wheel"
- "A Couple of Hamburgers"
- "A Ride with Olympy"
- "A Sequence of Servants"
- "The Bear Who Let it Alone"
- "The Black Magic of Barney Haller"
- "The Breaking Up of the Winships", 1945
- "The Cane in the Corridor"
- "The Car We Had to Push"
- "The Catbird Seat", 1942
- "The Crow and the Oriole"
- "The Curb in the Sky"
- "The Day the Dam Broke"
- "The Departure of Emma Inch"
- "Destructive Forces Life"
- "Doc Marlowe"
- "Draft Board Nights"
- "File and Forget"
- "If Grant Had Been Drinking at Appomattox"
- "More Alarms at Night"
- "Mr. Preble Gets Rid of His Wife"
- "Oh When I Was..."
- "One is a Wanderer"
- "Sex Ex Machina"
- "Snapshot of a Dog"
- "The Dog That Bit People"
- "The Evening's at Seven"
- "The Figgerin' Of Aunt Wilma"
- “A Friend to Alexander”
- "The Glass in the Field"
- "The Greatest Man in the World"
- "The Lady on 142"
- "The Little Girl and the Wolf"
- "The Macbeth Murder Mystery", 1937
- "The Man Who Hated Moonbaum"
- "The Man Who Knew Too Little", 1937
- "The Moth and the Star"
- "The Night the Bed Fell"
- "The Night the Ghost Got In"
- "The Owl Who Was God"
- "The Peacelike Mongoose"
- "The Princess and the Tin Box"
- "The Rabbits Who Caused All the Trouble"
- "The Remarkable Case of Mr.Bruhl"
- "The Scotty Who Knew Too Much"
- "The Seal Who Became Famous"
- "The Secret Life of James Thurber", 1943
- "The Secret Life of Walter Mitty"
- "The Sheep in Wolf's Clothing", 1939
- "The Subjunctive Mood", 1929
- "The Tiger Who Was to Be King"
- "The Topaz Cuff Links Mystery"
- "The Unicorn in the Garden"
- "The Whip-Poor-Will"
- "The Wood Duck"
- "University Days"
- "What Do You Mean It Was Brillig?"
- "You Could Look It Up", 1941

== Adaptations ==
=== Adaptations ===
- Thurber teamed with college schoolmate (and actor/director) Elliott Nugent to write The Male Animal, a comic drama that became a major Broadway hit in 1939. The play was adapted as a film by the same name in 1942, starring Henry Fonda, Olivia de Havilland and Jack Carson.
- In 1947 his short story "The Secret Life of Walter Mitty", was loosely adapted as a film by the same name. Danny Kaye played the title character.
- In 1951 United Productions of America announced an animated feature to be based on Thurber's work, titled Men, Women and Dogs. The only part of the ambitious project that was eventually released was the UPA cartoon The Unicorn in the Garden (1953).
- In 1958, Thurber's short story "One Is a Wanderer" was adapted for General Electric Theatre, resulting in Emmy nominations for writer Samuel Taylor and director Herschel Daugherty.
- The 1959 film The Battle of the Sexes was based on Thurber's 1942 short story "The Catbird Seat".
- In 1960, Thurber fulfilled a long-standing desire to be on the professional stage and played himself in 88 performances of the revue A Thurber Carnival (which echoes the title of his 1945 book, The Thurber Carnival). It was based on a selection of Thurber's stories and cartoon captions. Thurber appeared in the sketch "File and Forget". The sketch consists of Thurber dictating a series of letters in a vain attempt to keep one of his publishers from sending him books he did not order, and the escalating confusion of the replies. Thurber received a Special Tony Award for the adapted script of the Carnival.
- In 1961, "The Secret Life of James Thurber" aired on The DuPont Show with June Allyson. Adolphe Menjou appeared in the program as Fitch, and Orson Bean and Sue Randall portrayed John and Ellen Monroe.
- In 1969–70, a full series based on Thurber's writings and life, titled My World ... and Welcome to It, was broadcast on NBC. It starred William Windom as the Thurber figure, John Monroe. Featuring animated portions in addition to live actors, the show won a 1970 Emmy Award as the year's best comedy series. Windom won an Emmy as well. He went on to perform Thurber material in a one-man stage show.
- In 1972 another film adaptation, The War Between Men and Women, starring Jack Lemmon, concludes with an animated version of Thurber's classic anti-war work "The Last Flower".
- In 2013, a new adaptation of The Secret Life of Walter Mitty was produced, starring Ben Stiller as the title character.
