= The Secret Life of Walter Mitty (disambiguation) =

"The Secret Life of Walter Mitty" is a 1939 short story by James Thurber. It may also refer to:

- The Secret Life of Walter Mitty (1947 film), a film loosely based on Thurber's story, but predominantly created to showcase lead actor Danny Kaye
- The Secret Life of Walter Mitty (2013 film), a remake of the 1947 film, by Ben Stiller

== See also ==
- The Secret Lives of Waldo Kitty, 1970s children's television series
