= Rise and Shine (film) =

1941 film by Allan Dwan

- Directed by: Allan Dwan
- Written by: Herman J. Mankiewicz
- Based on: My Life and Hard Times by James Thurber
- Produced by: Mark Hellinger
- Starring: Jack Oakie; George Murphy; Linda Darnell
- Cinematography: Edward Cronjager
- Edited by: Allen McNeil
- Music by: David Buttolph; Cyril J. Mockridge; Alfred Newman
- Production company: Twentieth Century Fox
- Distributed by: Twentieth Century Fox
- Release date: November 21, 1941
- Running time: 92 minutes
- Country: United States
- Language: English

Rise and Shine is a 1941 American comedy crime film directed by Allan Dwan and starring Jack Oakie, George Murphy and Linda Darnell. It was produced and distributed by Twentieth Century Fox. It is inspired by the 1933 autobiography My Life and Hard Times by James Thurber.

== Plot ==
Gambling interests plan to kidnap star college football player Boley Bolenciecwcz to prevent him from playing in a big game where they have backed the other side.

== Cast ==
- Jack Oakie as Boley Bolenciecwcz
- George Murphy as Jimmy McGonigle
- Linda Darnell as Louise Murray
- Walter Brennan as Grandpa
- Milton Berle as Seabiscuit
- Sheldon Leonard as Menace
- Donald Meek as Professor Philip Murray
- Ruth Donnelly as Mame Bacon
- Raymond Walburn as Colonel Bacon
- Donald MacBride as Coach Graham
- Emma Dunn as Mrs. Murray
- Charles Waldron as President
- Mildred Gover as Mrs. Robertson
- William Haade as Butch
- Dick Rich as Gogo
- John Hiestand as Announcer
- Claire Du Brey as Miss Pinkham
- Paul Harvey as Orville Turner
- Francis Pierlot as Professor Schnauzer
- Nestor Paiva as Captain

== Bibliography ==
- Davis, Ronald L. Hollywood Beauty: Linda Darnell and the American Dream. University of Oklahoma Press, 2014.
