= A Thurber Carnival =

Revue by James Thurber

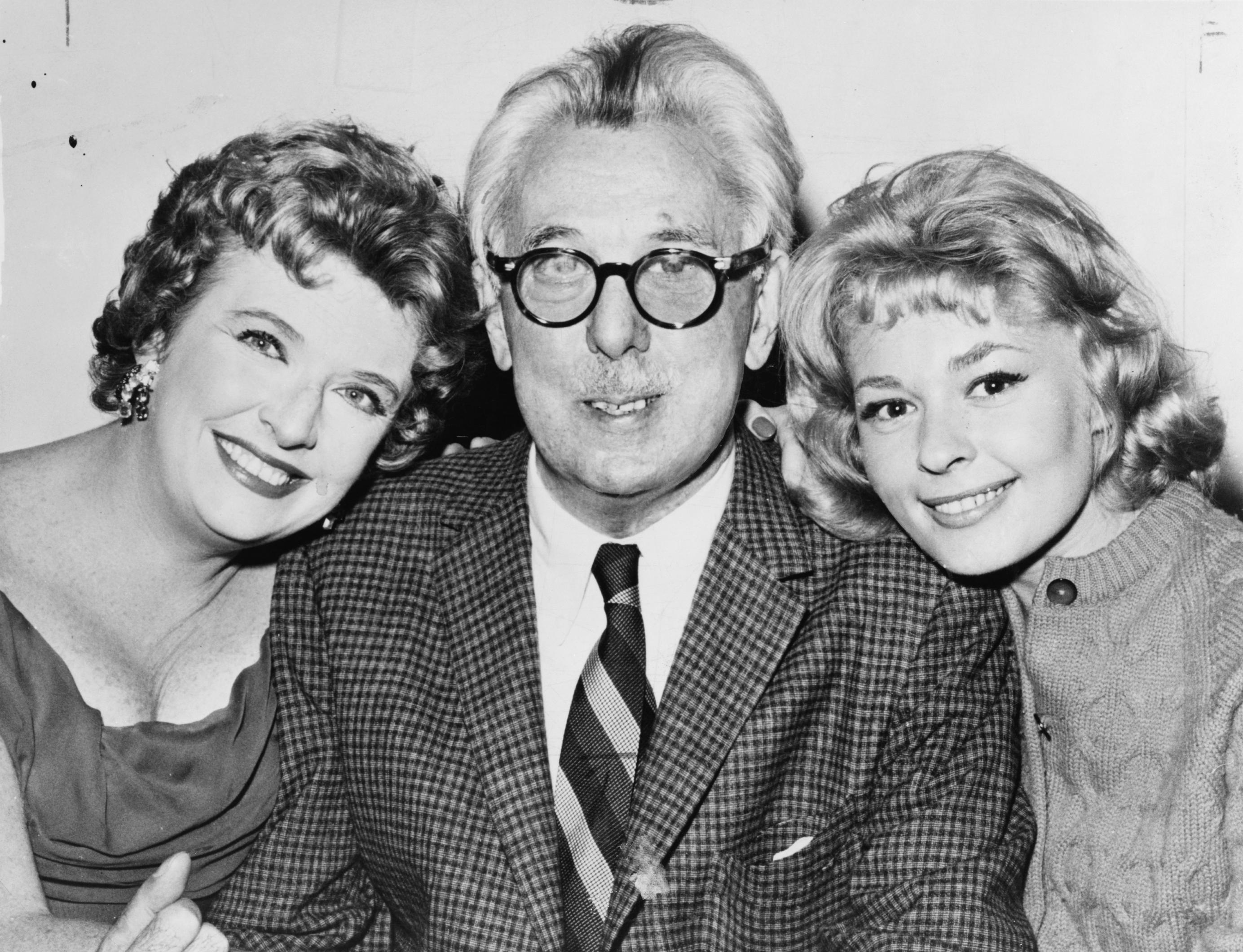
- Peggy Cass, James Thurber and Joan Anderson promoting A Thurber Carnival
- Written by: James Thurber
- Characters: First Man; Second Man; Third Man; Fourth Man; Fifth Man; First Woman; Second Woman; Third Woman; Fourth Woman
- Original language: English
- Subject: men and women
- Genre: satire, revue

Premiere
- Date premiered: February 26, 1960

A Thurber Carnival is a revue by James Thurber, adapted by the author from his stories, cartoons and casuals (humorous short pieces), nearly all of which originally appeared in The New Yorker. It was directed by Burgess Meredith with James Starbuck serving as associate director. Following a six city tryout, during which Thurber continued to rewrite the show, it premiered on Broadway on February 26, 1960, and ran for 223 performances, with a break from June 25 to September 5. It closed on November 26, 1960. The title is similar to that of The Thurber Carnival (1945), Thurber's most successful collection of stories and drawings.

== Cast and format ==
The nine member cast played roles generically designated as First Man, First Woman, etc., as listed in the published script. Each of these roles included portrayals of numerous characters within the revue's 16 sketches. The opening night cast was as follows:

| Actor | Role | Characters |
|---|---|---|
| Tom Ewell | First Man | Grant, He, Anderson, The Pet Counsellor, James Thurber, Walter Mitty, Narrator |
| Paul Ford | Second Man | Father, Man, Wolf, Lee, Darrel Darke, Bailey, Preble, Clint Jordan, John, Secretary Bird, Mr. Pritchard-Mitford, The Leader |
| John McGiver | Third Man | Psychiatrist, Lee's Staff Man, Visitor, Westwater, H. F. Cluffman, Owl, Dr. Renshaw |
| Peter Turgeon | Fourth Man | Narrator, Officer, Announcer, Mole, Lt. Berg, Dr. Remington |
| Charles Braswell | Fifth Man | Wolf, Policeman, Shultz, Mole, Clothes Moth, First Voice, Dr. Benbow |
| Peggy Cass | First Woman | Mother, She, Mrs. Preble, Miss Alma Winege, Lou, Mrs. Mitty, Narrator |
| Alice Ghostley | Second Woman | She, Salesgirl, Miss Whittaker, Jeanette Gaines, Nellie, Narrator |
| Wynne Miller | Third Woman | Daughter, Little Girl, Bargirl, Girl, Miss Daley, Miss Wynne, Luna Moth, Nurse |
| Margo Lungreen | Fourth Woman | Miss Bagley, Red Fox |

These were supported by the jazz music of the Don Elliott Quartet (Jack Six, Jimmy Raney, Ronnie Bedford and Don Elliott).

James Thurber played himself in 88 performances, dictating letters in the sketch "File and Forget".

== ACT 1 ==
The sketches in Act One of the revue are as follows:

=== Word Dance (Part 1) ===
Word Dance (Part 1) is a series of punchlines, delivered during breaks in the music as the characters dance, similar to the "Cocktail Party" sketches that later appeared in the television series Laugh-In. The scene was staged by James Starbuck, with music from the Don Elliott Quartet. The characters were credited only by the generic names (and as "performer" in the Internet Broadway Database). The punchlines were primarily derived from the captions of Thurber cartoons, including "Where did you get those big brown eyes and that tiny mind?" Part 2 of the sketch appears at the end of Act 2.

=== The Night the Bed Fell ===
The Night the Bed Fell consists of First Man sitting at the edge of the stage, telling the story of a particular night from his (Thurber's) childhood, when a collapsing bed provoked remarkable reactions from members of his eccentric extended family. The fictionalized reminiscence first appeared in The New Yorker on July 8, 1933, and was reprinted in the book My Life and Hard Times (1933).

=== Fables (Part 1) ===
Fables (Part 1) is a set of three of Thurber's Fables for Our Time, originally staged by James Starbuck. In each fable, the nominally animal characters dress and behave as humans. It includes the following:

- "The Wolf at the Door" - narrated by Second Woman. Characters include the Daughter (Third Woman), the Mother (First Woman), the Father (Second Man) and the Wolf (Fifth Man). The Sheep family argues over whether the visitor at the door is the Wolf or the Fuller Brush Man. The fable originally appeared in The New Yorker on July 28, 1956, and was collected in the book Further Fables for Our Time (1956).
- "The Unicorn in the Garden" - narrated by Fourth Man. The characters are Man (First Man), She (Second Woman), Psychiatrist (Third Man) and Policeman (Fifth Man). Based on Thurber's most famous fable, it is about a man who sees a unicorn, and subsequently turns the tables on the hostile wife who does not believe him when he tells her about the incident. The unicorn is not seen on stage. The story first appeared in The New Yorker on October 31, 1939; and was first collected in his book Fables for Our Time & Famous Poems Illustrated (Harper and Brothers, 1940).
- "The Little Girl and the Wolf " - narrated by First Woman. The characters are Wolf (Second Man) and Little Girl (Third Woman). Based on the story of Little Red Riding Hood, it ends with the girl shooting the wolf, who delivers the fable's moral. The fable first appeared in The New Yorker on January 21, 1939, and was collected in Fables for Our Time and Famous Poems Illustrated (1940).

=== If Grant Had Been Drinking at Appomattox ===
"If Grant Had Been Drinking at Appomattox" - narrated by Fourth Man. The characters are Corporal Shultz of the Sixty-fifth Ohio Volunteer Infantry, aide to Grant (Fifth Man), Grant (First Man), Lee (Second Man), Lee's Staff Man (Third Man) and Officer (Fourth Man). Thurber's "what if" story about Grant and Lee at the Appomattox surrender first appeared in The New Yorker on December 6, 1930; and was first collected in his book The Middle-Aged Man on the Flying Trapeze (Harper and Brothers, 1935).

=== Casuals of the Keys ===
"Casuals of the Keys" features two characters, Visitor (Third Man) and Darrel Darke (Second Man). It consists of Captain Darke telling his visitor unlikely stories of the people he has met. The story first appeared in The New Yorker on May 7, 1932, and was reprinted in The Middle Aged Man on the Flying Trapeze.

=== The Macbeth Murder Mystery ===
"The Macbeth Murder Mystery" lists its two characters as He (First Man) and She (First Woman). When a murder mystery aficionado finds herself with nothing to read but Macbeth, she concludes that Macbeth was not the killer, and gives her acquaintance a very different way of looking at William Shakespeare's works. The story appeared in The New Yorker on October 2, 1937, and was reprinted in My World—and Welcome to It (1942).

=== Gentlemen Shoppers ===
"Gentlemen Shoppers" - narrated by Fourth Man. Characters include Salesgirl (Second Woman), Westwater (Third Man), Bargirl (Third Woman), Anderson (First Man), and Bailey (Second Man). This story of drunken shoppers was specially written for A Thurber Carnival. It did not appear in The New Yorker, and has never been published in prose form.

=== The Last Flower ===
"The Last Flower" - The First Man narrates this slide show of Thurber's cartoon series about the aftermath of World War XII, which first appeared as a book, The Last Flower: A Parable in Pictures (Harper and Brothers, 1939). An animated version of it was later featured in the Thurber-inspired film The War Between Men and Women.

== ACT 2 ==
The sketches in Act Two of the revue are as follows:

=== The Pet Department ===
"The Pet Department" features the Announcer (Fourth Man), the Pet Counsellor (First Man), Miss Whittaker (Second Woman), and a Girl (Third Woman). This is an advice show, in which the audience is shown Thurber cartoons of pets about which the advice is sought. Some of the individual letters and responses first appeared in a mock column in The New Yorker entitled "Our Pet Department" in 1930. The complete prose and drawings appeared in The Owl in the Attic and Other Perplexities (Harper and Brothers, 1931).

=== Mr. Preble Gets Rid of His Wife ===
"Mr. Preble Gets Rid of His Wife" features Preble (Second Man), Miss Daley (Third Woman), and Mrs. Preble (First Woman). When Mr. Preble wants to run off with another woman, his wife attempts to stage manage her own murder. The story appeared in The New Yorker on March 4, 1933, and was reprinted in My World—and Welcome to It.

=== File and Forget ===
"File and Forget" includes the characters James Thurber (First Man), Miss Bagley (Fourth Woman), Miss Alma Winege (First Woman), Miss Wynne (Third Woman), Jeannette Gaines (Second Woman), Clint Jordan (Second Man), H. F. Cluffman (Third Man). The sketch consists of Thurber dictating a series of letters in a vain attempt to keep one of his publishers from sending him books he did not order, and the escalating confusion of the replies. The real Thurber, who was completely blind at the time and nearing the end of his life, played himself in later performances of the show. The original casual appeared in the New Yorker on January 8, 1949, and was reprinted in Thurber Country: The Classic Collection About Males, and Females, Mainly of Our Own Species (Simon & Schuster, 1953).

=== Take Her Up Tenderly ===
"Take Her Up Tenderly" features the characters John (Second Man), Nellie (Second Woman), and Lou (First Woman), updating classic poetry to be more cheerful. The prose version of the piece, which was a humorous essay rather than a short story, originally appeared in The Bermudian, and was collected in Thurber Country.

=== Fables (Part 2) ===
"Fables (Part 2) " consists of two more Thurber fables, originally staged by James Starbuck. They are:

- "The Owl Who Was God" - narrated by Second Woman, this features the characters Owl (Third Man), Moles (Fourth Man and Fifth Man), Secretary Bird (Second Man), and Red Fox (Fourth Woman), in a story about too many people being fooled "too much of the time". The fable first appeared in The New Yorker on April 29, 1939, and was collected in Fables for Our Time and Famous Poems Illustrated (1940).
- "The Clothes Moth and the Luna Moth" - narrated by First Man, this cynical story of unrequited desire features two characters, Luna Moth (Third Woman) and Clothes Moth (Fifth Man). The fable first appeared in The New Yorker on May 19, 1956, and was collected in Further Fables for Our Time (1956).

=== The Secret Life of Walter Mitty ===
"The Secret Life of Walter Mitty" - narrated by Fourth Man. This adaptation of Thurber's most famous short story features the characters Walter Mitty (First Man), Mrs. Mitty (First Woman), First Voice (Fifth Man), Lieut. Berg (Fourth Man), Nurse (Third Woman), Dr. Renshaw (Third Man), Dr. Benbow (Fifth Man), Dr. Remington (Fourth Man), Mr. Pritchard-Mitford (Second Man) and The Leader (Second Man). Mitty, a meek dreamer, imagines himself as the hero of four adventures. The stage version features a slightly more upbeat ending than the short story, with Mitty outwitting a firing squad. The original short story first appeared in The New Yorker on March 18, 1939; and was first collected in his book My World and Welcome to It (Harcourt, Brace and Company, 1942).

=== Word Dance (Part 2) ===
"Word Dance (Part 2) " - Originally staged by James Starbuck, this is the continuation of the sketch that begins the show. Like Part 1, it is based on captions from Thurber’s cartoons and some of his other writings. It concludes with a request, taken from the last line of "The Ladies of Orlon" (from Alarms & Diversions, 1957), for the women in the audience to keep their seats until the men have left the theater. "They need, God knows, a head start."

== Staging ==
Notes in the script call for a set design (originally by Marvin Reiss) that features painted white furniture, with black lines painted slightly askew to mimic the look of Thurber's cartoons. The scenery also includes backdrops, cutouts and a white scrim that reproduce some of the cartoons themselves. The production is meant to include original music written for the show by Don Elliott.

== Album ==
An original cast album, featuring both music and dialogue from the show, was released by Columbia Records in 1960.

== Awards ==
James Thurber (writer) and Burgess Meredith (director) won a 1960 Tony Awards Special Award for A Thurber Carnival.

== Sequel ==
A second revue based on Thurber's work, The Beast in Me, opened on Broadway on May 14, 1963, and closed four days later. Adapted by James Costigan from eleven of Thurber's Fables for Our Time, it starred Kaye Ballard and Bert Convy, with music by Don Elliott.
