= The Night the Bed Fell =

Humorous 1933 short story

"The Night the Bed Fell" is a short story published by American author James Thurber in 1933. The story is a brief account of an event that took place at his house in Columbus, Ohio. It appears as chapter one of My Life and Hard Times.

== Structure ==
The story is a memoir written in the first person. It has a subjective angle, and is ordered chronologically.

The plot for "The Night The Bed Fell" starts with James Thurber describing eclectic members of his family, including a crazy cousin, Beall, who thinks he will die of suffocation in his sleep, an aunt who throws shoes down the house's hallway each night in a vain attempt to scare away burglars, and a grandfather that leaves the house for several days at a time, returning later and stating the Civil War as ongoing, and that the "Army of the Potomac" does not have a chance in hell. One of his aunts fears the day when someone will release chloroform in her bedroom to get her belongings.

The narrator relates an incident in his youth when a bed fell on his father. The father occasionally sleeps in the attic where he thinks before slumbering on an old wooden bed. By midnight of the particular night, everyone is in bed. At two in the morning, the narrator's own bed (an army cot) tips over. Unhurt, he continues to sleep. The noise awakens his mother, who thinks that the wobbly headboard on the bed in the attic had fallen on the father. His cousin awakes due to the mother's shouting, believing that he is not breathing. He pours a glass of camphor of spirits over his head and begins to choke. It is at this point the narrator awakes, believing people are trying to wake him to get him out of a perilous situation. The mother rushes to open the attic door but it is stuck. The battering on the attic door awakens the father, who thinks the house is on fire. He yells that he is coming but the family believes he is dying and giving up his spirit to God. The narrator and the brother finally emerge from the room; the dog, alarmed by all the noise, leaps at the cousin believing him an intruder. Finally, the father opens the attic door to demands to know what is happening, at which point they piece together the events of the night. When the incident finally gets sorted out the next morning, the mother, quite optimistic by nature, states thankfully, "I'm glad your grandfather was not at home".

== Sequel ==
This story has a sequel, More Alarms at Night.
