= Sanford–Curtis–Thurber House =

Historic house in Connecticut, United States

- U.S. National Register of Historic Places
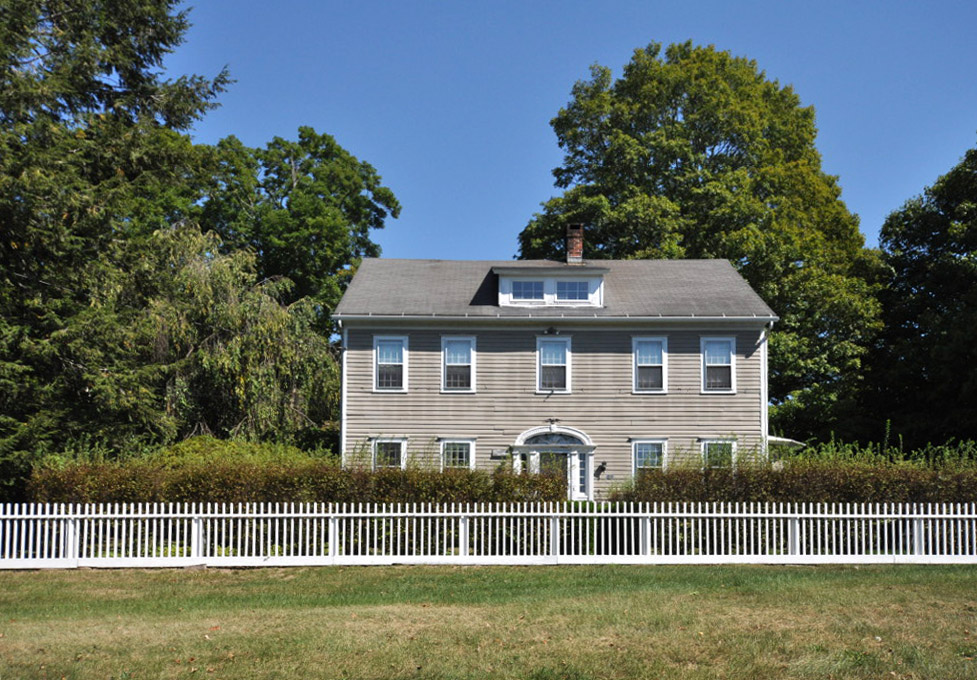

- Location within Connecticut Location within the United States
- Location: 71 Riverside Road, Newtown, Connecticut
- Coordinates: 41°25′31″N 73°15′49″W
- Area: 2 acres (0.81 ha)
- Built: c.1800
- Architectural style: Georgian
- NRHP reference No.: 07000557
- Added to NRHP: June 21, 2007

The Sanford–Curtis–Thurber House, also known as James Thurber House, is a historic house at 71 Riverside Road in the Sandy Hook section of Newtown, Connecticut. It is a Georgian style house built in c.1780 that was listed on the National Register of Historic Places in 2007.

The house is a large, rural Georgian style farmhouse built for a prosperous farmer named Thomas Sanford (1732-1814), one of the first settlers in the Newtown area. The family farm was sold in 1824 to Hezekiah Curtis (1796-1866).

The house was purchased in 1931 by Althea Thurber, the first wife of author and humorist James Thurber (1894–1961), and it was used as a weekend or holiday home. It was ostensibly a place where Althea could have dogs, and the family dogs inspired and appeared in Thurber's humorous sketches in The New Yorker magazine. Thurber’s only daughter was born while he lived in this home, and he wrote much of his most famous work My Life and Hard Times while here. Sections of wall were covered with his sketches and are now housed in the Thurber House at Ohio State University.

== See also ==
- National Register of Historic Places listings in Fairfield County, Connecticut
- Newtown, Connecticut
