= Harrigan (song) =

1908 song written by George M. Cohan

"Harrigan" is a song written by George M. Cohan for the short-lived 1908 Broadway musical Fifty Miles from Boston when it was introduced by James C. Marlowe. It celebrates, and to some extent mocks, his own Irish heritage. It is also an affectionate homage to Edward Harrigan, a previous great Irish American contributor to American musical theater.

The song was performed by James Cagney and Joan Leslie in the 1942 film Yankee Doodle Dandy, a biopic of Cohan's life. In that film it was portrayed as an early work of Cohan's that he was shopping around. In real life, by 1907 he had already scored some major Broadway hits and had little need to try to sell individual songs to producers.

Contemporary Irish-American singer Billy Murray made a very popular recording of the song for Victor Records (catalog No. 5197) in 1907. In his version, the answer "Harrigan!" to each question is shouted by a background group. Edward Meeker was another who enjoyed success with his recording of the song in 1907.

== Lyrics ==
Who is the man who will spend or will even lend?
Harrigan, that's me!
Who is your friend when you find that you need a friend?
Harrigan, that's me!
For I'm just as proud of my name, you see
As an emperor, czar or a king could be
Who is the man helps a man ev'ry time he can?
Harrigan, that's me!

H, A, double-R, I, G, A, N spells Harrigan
Proud of all the Irish blood that's in me
Divvil a man can say a word agin me
H, A, double-R, I, G, A, N you see
Is a name that a shame never has been connected with
Harrigan, that's me!

Who is the man never stood for a gadabout?
Harrigan, that's me!
Who is the man that the town's simply mad about?
Harrigan that's me!
The ladies and babies are fond of me
I'm fond of them, too, in return, you see
Who is the gent that's deserving a monument?
Harrigan, that's me!

H, A, double-R, I, G, A, N spells Harrigan
Proud of all the Irish blood that's in me
Divvil a man can say a word agin me
H, A, double-R, I, G, A, N you see
Is a name that a shame never has been connected with
Harrigan, that's me!

Bing Crosby included the song in a medley on his album 101 Gang Songs (1961)

The song was used decades later for a 1960-1961 ABC television series, Harrigan and Son, about a father-and-son law firm. Its lead players, Pat O'Brien and Roger Perry, would sing the song, silhouetted behind the closing credits of the show.

In his New York gubernatorial campaigns in 1954 and 1958, as well as his bid for the Democratic presidential nomination in 1956, Averell Harriman used a variation of the song, which sang of "H, A, double-R, I, M, A, N". In 1960, John F. Kennedy's campaign released a recording of Frank Sinatra singing a version of "High Hopes" that included lyrics written specifically for "K, E, double-N, E, D, Y"

The song was adapted - replacing "H, A, double-R, I, G, A, N" with "G, I, double-L, I, G, A, N" - in the Gilligan's Island episode "The Little Dictator", when Gilligan dreams that he is the president of a banana republic.

It was also featured several times in the 1938 film "Hold That Co-ed" as a campaign theme song for John Barrymore's character "Governor Gabby Harrigan".

The song is subject of multiple parodies in American juvenile oral tradition, with versions about "L, O, Double L, I, P, O, P" or "D, A, V, E, N, P, O, R, T" and others. Examples can be found in "The Whim-Wham Book" by Duncan Emrich and in "Greasy Grimy Gopher Guts: The Subversive Folklore of Childhood" by Josepha Sherman and T. K. F. Weisskopf.

The Kidsongs Kids and the Biggles covered the song in their 1998 video "Adventures in Biggleland: Meet the Biggles".

The term "divvil" is an Irish expression that often found its way into Irish songs of that era. It essentially means "nary" or "hardly". [edit] “divvil” is Scots and Irish slang for “devil.” Meaning “only a devil would say a word against me,” or “anyone who speaks against me should be ‘bedeviled.’”

Allan Sherman's short medley of Cohan song parodies included this tune, reworked to sing about pianist Vladimir Horowitz.

A character sings the song in A Couple of Hamburgers, a short story by James Thurber.
