= Sandy Hook, Connecticut =

Village in Connecticut

- Village
- Village of Sandy Hook
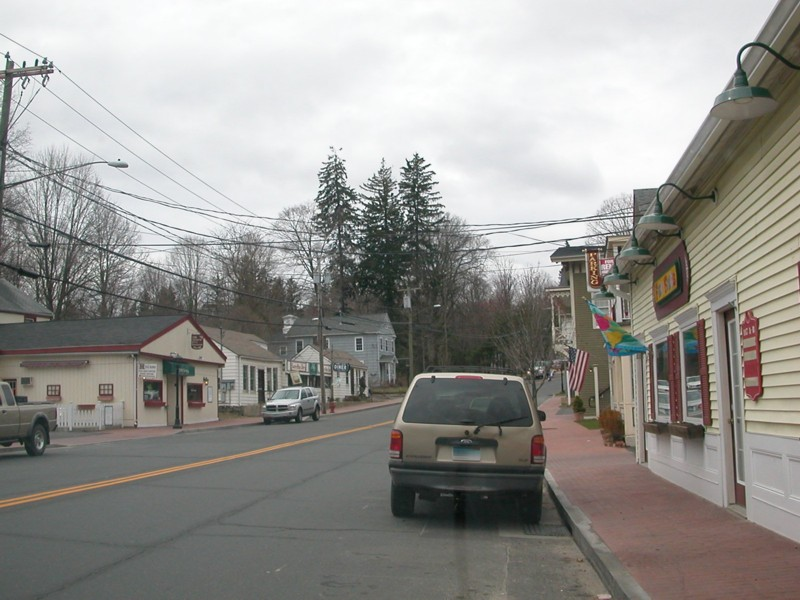
- Sandy Hook in 2007

- Location within the Western Connecticut Planning Region and the state of Connecticut
- Coordinates: 41°25′7″N 73°16′33″W
- Country: United States
- U.S. state: Connecticut
- County: Fairfield
- Metropolitan area: Danbury
- Town: Newtown
- Established: 1711
- Time zone: UTC−5 (EST)
  - Summer (DST): UTC−4 (EDT)
- ZIP code: 06482
- Area codes: 203/475

Sandy Hook is a village in the town of Newtown, Connecticut, United States, founded in 1711. It was listed as a census-designated place prior to the 2020 census. According to the United States Census Bureau in 2021, it has a population of 9,114.

== History ==
Sandy Hook was founded in 1711 when several proprietors with land in the area relocated together to reduce isolation. Within a year of the settlement of Newtown, some of its proprietors began moving away from the central village to some of their larger parcels. Colonists found that the Pootatuck River at Sandy Hook allowed for saw and gristmills, leading to it becoming one of the first outlying areas to be settled.

In 1839, the chemist and engineer Charles Goodyear accidentally invented the process of vulcanization while living on Glen Road, to the north of Sandy Hook center. This led to the creation and prosperity of the Goodyear Rubber Packing factory in the following 15 years, and hugely impacted the manufacturing industry in the following decades.

The Sandy Hook neighborhood did not grow dramatically until the mid-19th century post-industrialization, due to innovation and economic growth caused by businesses such as the Goodyear Rubber Packing Factory.

=== 2012 school shooting ===
On December 14, 2012, 20-year-old Adam Lanza shot and killed his mother at home, and then drove to Sandy Hook Elementary School where he killed 20 children aged 6–7 along with six adults. He died by suicide when police arrived at the school. It was the second-deadliest mass shooting in U.S. history at the time, after the 2007 Virginia Tech shootings. Following the shooting, both the Lanza family home and Sandy Hook Elementary School were demolished, in 2013 and 2016 respectively; a new school was built at the same site.

== Geography ==
Located within Newtown, Sandy Hook borders the Newtown borough and the village of Botsford to the south, as well as the towns of Monroe, Southbury, and Oxford along the Housatonic River, to the east. The immediate area surrounding Sandy Hook village contains multiple amenities and green spaces including Rocky Glen State Park and Paugussett State Forest, as well as Timothy B. Treadwell Memorial Park and the Sandy Hook Memorial Park.

Sandy Hook includes the communities of Berkshire, Riverside, Walnut Tree Hill, and Zoar. It also extends for a short distance into the town of Monroe along Old Zoar Road and Bagburn Hill/Jordan Hill Road.

=== Landmarks ===
Sandy Hook has a few historic landmarks on the National Register of Historic Places.

- Nathan B. Lattin Farm
- New York Belting and Packing Co.
- Sanford–Curtis–Thurber House

== Religious sites ==
The Newtown United Methodist Church was created for the Newtown Methodist in the 1850s. In 1972 it was moved to its current location, in the centre of Sandy Hook.

== Notable people ==
- Mackie Samoskevich, NHL player
- Maddy Samoskevich, PWHL player
- John Angel, sculptor
- Luther Meade Blackman, major during the American Civil War accused of forging the Bat Creek inscription
- Suzanne Collins, American television writer and author of The Underland Chronicles and The Hunger Games trilogy
- Anthony Edwards, actor
- William Hamilton Gibson, 19th-century illustrator, author, and naturalist
- Charles Goodyear, gained renown in 1839 for the technique of the vulcanization of rubber
- Ruth Gordon, actress and wife of Garson Kanin
- Arthur Twining Hadley, 13th president of Yale University
- Charles R. Jackson, 1950s writer and novelist, author of The Lost Weekend
- Caitlyn Jenner, 1976 Summer Olympics decathlon gold medalist
- Elia Kazan, stage/motion picture director and author
- Steven Kellogg, illustrator
- Grace Moore, operatic soprano and actress in musical theater and film
- Valentin Panera, Spanish actor, husband of Grace Moore
- Molly Pearson, 20th-century stage actress
- Albert Berger Rossdale, U.S. Representative from New York
- James Thurber, writer, satirist, cartoonist, author of "The Secret Life of Walter Mitty"
- Marcus Tracy, professional soccer player
- Mead Treadwell, 13th Lieutenant Governor of Alaska and former chair of the U.S. Arctic Research Commission
- Jenna von Oÿ, actress and singer
- Thelma Wood, sculptor
- Wally Cox, actor
- Antonio Fargas, actor
- Max Nacewicz, professional football player
