= A Couple of Hamburgers =

1935 short story by James Thurber

- Short story by James Thurber
- Country: United States
- Language: English

Publication
- Published in: The New Yorker
- Publication date: 1935

"A Couple of Hamburgers" is a 1935 short story by James Thurber, the American writer, considered to be one of his best.

It is a thumbnail sketch of a couple in a dysfunctional marriage.

It has been suggested that while "The Secret Life of Walter Mitty", arguably Thurber's best-known short story, is a comical story with a tragic side, this is a tragic story with a comical side.
