= Max Nacewicz =

American football player (born 1993)

Profile
- Position: Linebacker

Personal information
- Born: June 5, 1993 (age 33); Sandy Hook, Connecticut, U.S.
- Listed height: 6 ft 2 in (1.88 m)
- Listed weight: 250 lb (113 kg)

Career information
- College: Springfield College
- NFL draft: 2015: undrafted

Career history
- Tampa Bay Storm (2017); Albany Empire (2018); Saarland Hurricanes (2018); Barcelona Dragons (2022)*
- * Offseason or practice squad member only

Awards and highlights
- All-American Team; Liberty League Defensive Player of the Year (2015)

Max Nacewicz (born June 5, 1993) is an American former football linebacker. He first played in the arena football for the Tampa Bay Storm and then in the German Football League for the Saarland Hurricanes. In 2022, he signed with the Barcelona Dragons in the European League of Football but retired in the preseason.

Nacewicz played college football for the Springfield Pride football program where he was named multiple times All-American.

== Early life ==
Nacewicz attended Newtown High School in Sandy Hook, Connecticut, where he played lacrosse and football under the coaching of former NFL player Steve George as a linebacker.

== College career ==
He enrolled at Springfield College and played for the football varsity team. To this day, he holds multiple school records like tackles for loss (41) and sacks (27). Nacewicz graduated in 2015 leading his team and was named Liberty League Defensive Player of the Year, and a Division III All-American. He also was Cliff Harris Award finalist and D3football.com All-East Region Second Team.

== Professional career ==
=== Tampa Bay Storm ===
After going unselected in the 2015 NFL draft, he had several workouts with the Montreal Alouettes in the Canadian Football League and Philadelphia Soul but was not signed by either team. He signed with the Tampa Bay Storm of the Arena Football League (AFL) for their 2017 season, bringing the team to the ArenaBowl XXX.

=== Saarland Hurricanes ===
After his first arena league season, Nacewicz played shortly for the Albany Empire (AFL) before being signed mid-season by the Hurricanes in the GFL 2. With him, the Canes finished 2nd of the GLF 2 south division and missing the promotion to the German Football League top level.

=== Barcelona Dragons ===
On April 26, 2022, Nacewicz signed with the Barcelona Dragons for the 2022 European League of Football season. Shortly before the start of the season, Nacewicz announced his retirement from professional football.

== Personal life ==
Nacewicz majored in applied exercise science at Springfield.
