= The Unicorn in the Garden =

- Short story by James Thurber
- Detail from James Thurber's original illustration
- Country: United States
- Language: English
- Genres: Fable, short story

Publication
- Published in: The New Yorker
- Publication type: Magazine
- Publisher: Harper & Brothers
- Media type: Print (Periodical, Hardback & Paperback) & AudioBook
- Publication date: 1939 (magazine), 1940 (book)

Chronology
- Series: Fables For Our Time
The Patient Bloodhound	The Rabbits Who Caused All the Trouble

"The Unicorn in the Garden" is a short story written by James Thurber. One of the most famous of Thurber's humorous modern fables, it first appeared in The New Yorker on October 21, 1939; and was first collected in his book Fables for Our Time and Famous Poems Illustrated (Harper and Brothers, 1940). The fable has since been reprinted in The Thurber Carnival (Harper and Brothers, 1945), James Thurber: Writings and Drawings (The Library of America, 1996, ISBN 1-883011-22-1), The Oxford Book of Modern Fairy Tales, and other publications. It is taught in literature and rhetoric courses.

== Plot summary ==
A husband sees a unicorn in the family garden and tells his wife about it. She ridicules him, telling him "the unicorn is a mythical beast" and calls him a "booby". When he persists, she threatens to send him to the "booby hatch" (the mental institution). He persists, and she summons the authorities. However, after she tells them what her husband saw and they note her own somewhat loony-looking facial features, they force her into a straitjacket. They then ask the husband if he told his wife he had seen a unicorn. This gives the husband a way to get rid of a cranky wife, and he tells them,"The unicorn is a mythical beast." Thus they take the wife away instead, and "the husband lived happily ever after". The story ends with, "Moral: Don't count your boobies before they're hatched", a play on the popular adage, "Don't count your chickens before they're hatched". Thus, the moral advises not to expect one's hopes to be a certainty. Another short story by Thurber, “The Catbird Seat” has a similar theme.

== In popular culture ==
=== Adaptations ===
An animated version of the story was released by United Productions of America in 1953. The cartoon was directed by William Hurtz, and was originally intended to be part of a feature based on Thurber's work, to be called Men, Women and Dogs. In 1994, it was voted #48 of the 50 Greatest Cartoons of all time by members of the animation field.

The fable was also adapted to the stage as part of the 1960 revue A Thurber Carnival. The original cast for this portion of the stage production was as follows:

- Paul Ford - Man
- Alice Ghostley - She
- John McGiver - Psychiatrist
- Peter Turgeon - Narrator
- Charles Braswell - Policeman

The fable was animated again as part of the My World and Welcome to It episode "The Night the House Caught Fire", which first aired October 13, 1969. In the episode, William Windom as John Monroe tells the story to his daughter Lydia (Lisa Gerritsen) as his accompanying drawings come to life for the viewer. The episode was written and directed by series creator Melville Shavelson. The animation for the series was by DePatie-Freleng Enterprises.

Also in 1969, a musical adaptation of "The Unicorn in the Garden", composed by Russell Smith, was performed by the Denver Lyric Opera in Denver.

In a 1985 episode of The Tonight Show Starring Johnny Carson, Johnny mentions the story and tells sidekick Ed McMahon the plot.

An audio adaptation of the story, read by Peter Ustinov, was released by Caedmon Audio in 1986 (ISBN 0-89845-641-X).

=== Allusions ===
The 1950 film Harvey contains a scene depicting characters at a psychiatrist's office, where Veta is committed to the institution instead of Elwood.

Dr. Richard Lenski, leader of the E. coli long-term evolution experiment, made an allusion to the story in a widely disseminated response to Conservapedia founder Andrew Schlafly (who expressed doubt Lenski found an evolutionary beneficial mutation in E. coli bacteria): "In other words, it's not that we claim to have glimpsed 'a unicorn in the garden' – we have a whole population of them living in my lab!"

The ninth episode of the TV series Life on Mars has similarities with the story. The protagonist, Detective Inspector Sam Tyler tells a criminal that he, Tyler, is a time traveller from the future. When the criminal tells Tyler's colleagues of this, in an attempt to discredit him, Tyler denies being the source of the 'delusion' and the criminal is discredited instead.

"The Sloths", a song by Red Krayola, has been described as "a peculiar rewrite of a James Thurber short story (The Unicorn in the Garden)".

In the 1985 short fiction piece "Scrabble with God" by John M. Ford a newly created animal is described as "eating the rosebushes, like Thurber's unicorn".
