= Walter Mitty =

Fictional character created by James Thurber

- First appearance: "The Secret Life of Walter Mitty"; The New Yorker, March 18, 1939
- Created by: James Thurber
- Portrayed by: Danny Kaye (1947); Ben Stiller (2013)

In-universe information
- Full name: Walter James Mitty
- Occupation: Various
- Spouse: Mrs. Mitty (wife)
- Religion: Christian
- Nationality: American

Walter Jackson Mitty is a fictional character in James Thurber's short story "The Secret Life of Walter Mitty", first published in The New Yorker on March 18, 1939, and in book form in My World—and Welcome to It in 1942.

Thurber loosely based the character, a daydreamer, on himself. It was made into a film in 1947, starring Danny Kaye, with a remake in 2013 directed by and starring Ben Stiller.

== Character and plot ==
Mitty is a hapless, absent-minded man with a vivid fantasy life. His apparent incompetence and inattention result in him being criticized, mocked, and otherwise treated dismissively. At the same time, Mitty's surroundings trigger him to enter fantasies in which he occupies a radically different social position, where he is assertive and authoritative, exceptionally competent, or formidable.

== Popular culture ==
The character's name has come into more general use to refer to an ineffectual dreamer and appears in several dictionaries. The American Heritage Dictionary defines a Walter Mitty as "an ordinary, often ineffectual person who indulges in fantastic daydreams of personal triumphs". The most famous of Thurber's inept male protagonists, the character is considered "the archetype for dreamy, hapless, Thurber Man".

When referring to actor Errol Flynn, Warner Brothers studio head, Jack L. Warner, noted in his autobiography, My First Hundred Years in Hollywood, "To the Walter Mittys of the world he [Flynn] was all the heroes in one magnificent, sexy, animal package."

In the song "Sex & Drugs & Rock & Roll", Ian Dury refers to the clothes of Mr. Walter Mitty as a better alternative to wearing grey, citing the character as an example of the unconventional.

In the December 2, 1963 edition of Newsweek Magazine (and later published as a slim book), Washington Post Editor Ben Bradlee recalled his friend John F. Kennedy in a column and described his, "Walter Mitty streak, as wide as his smile" citing Kennedy on the golf course when he played well as embodying Arnold Palmer's power or Julius Boros' finesse.

The 1969–1970 television series My World and Welcome to It is titled after Thurber's anthology that contained his Walter Mitty story. The short-lived series won two Emmys.

The character is mentioned in the opening lines of the Mark Lindsay 1970 hit song, "Silver Bird": "Get aboard the silver bird, departing gate 19/Satisfy your Walter Mitty mind, tryin' out a dream."

In his 1992 biography of Henry Kissinger, Walter Isaacson records that on October 6, 1973, during the 1973 Arab Israeli War, Kissinger urged President Richard Nixon's Chief of Staff General Alexander Haig to keep Nixon in Florida in order to avoid any "hysterical" moves and to keep any "Walter Mitty tendencies" under control.

In the 1997 book Into Thin Air by Jon Krakauer—a personal account of the events of the 1996 Everest disaster—Krakauer states: "Walter Mittys with Everest dreams need to bear in mind that when things go wrong up in the death zone (above 26,000 feet)—and sooner or later they always do—the strongest guides in the world may be powerless to save a client's life; indeed as the events of 1996 demonstrated, the strongest guides in the world are sometimes powerless to save even their own lives."

In the 1999 autobiography John Glenn: A Memoir by Mercury by astronaut and US Senator John Glenn, he states, "The average person could Walter Mitty him- or herself into winning the Indianapolis 500, since everybody drove a car; all you had to do was imagine yourself going faster and making nothing but left turns. But space was so new nobody had a way to relate to it realistically."

In 2007, automaker Ford stated that it had to exclude from the list of potential bidders "Walter Mitty" types who had dreams but no experience, prior to the sale of their Aston Martin British GT car brand to a consortium of business interests from America and the Middle East, headed by Prodrive founder and world rally championship owner David Richards.

Impostor Alan McIlwraith, who falsely claimed to be a knighted war hero, was dubbed "Sir Walter Mitty" by the press.

The Guardian reported on April 20, 2009 that a leaked British National Party training manual described some members as "liars, oddballs, and Walter Mitty types".

The Guardian reported on January 23, 2016 that up to 10% of servicemen and ex-servicemen who made use of the services of military psychiatrists for PTSD were "Walter Mitty" characters who fabricated or exaggerated their experiences in combat.

Terry Gilliam described his film Brazil as "Walter Mitty meets Franz Kafka".

In his January 20, 2021 column "Witless Ape Rides Helicopter" in National Review magazine, Kevin D. Williamson criticized the US Republican Party for the legacy of Donald Trump's presidency, saying "maybe turning your party over to Generalissimo Walter Mitty, his hideous scheming spawn, and the studio audience from Hee-Haw was not just absolutely aces as a political strategy."

=== British military slang ===
Individuals who impersonate serving or retired members of the armed forces are known as "Walts" in the British Armed Forces, a shortened form of "Walter Mitty". In the United Kingdom, it is an offence under the Armed Forces Act 2006 to wear real or replica military decorations to pretend to be a member of the armed forces.

In his book on selection for the SAS, Andy McNab wrote that soldiers from other units who were applying to join and who gave away they were motivated by reasons of personal vanity were labelled as "Walter Mitties" and quietly sent home.

== Films ==
The character was first played by Danny Kaye in the 1947 film version. Thurber opposed this 1947 production.

A 2013 re-make of the film starred, and was directed by Ben Stiller. This too bore little resemblance to Thurber's vision of the character.

== Music ==
Walter Mitty is referenced in the lyrics of these songs:

Title	Artist(s)	Released
"Silver Bird"	Mark Lindsay	1970
"Sex & Drugs & Rock & Roll"	Ian Dury	1977
"Lady Killer"	Flash and the Pan	1978
"Kitty Ricketts"	The Radiators	1979
"In The City"	Madness	1981
"Walter Mitty Blues"	The Meteors	1986
"Vacation"	Alabama	1986
"T&P Combo"	311	1995
"All Dressed Up For San Francisco"	The Philosopher Kings	1996
"Sammy Davis City"	Joe Strummer and Brian Setzer	1996
"Playing Xylophone"	Gordon Haskell	2000
"Dreams"	Descendents	2004
"A Questionnaire for Walter Mitty"	Duke Special	2017

== See also ==
- Fantasy prone personality
- Schizoid personality disorder
- Caspar Milquetoast, a cartoon character
- Snoopy, a cartoon dog from the Peanuts comic strip, who has a rich fantasy life
- Billy Liar, the fantasist protagonist in the eponymous 1959 novel
