= The Catbird Seat =

1942 short story by James Thurber

- Short story by James Thurber
- Country: United States
- Language: English
- Genre: short story

Publication
- Published in: The New Yorker, A Thurber Carnival
- Publication type: Magazine
- Publisher: Harcourt, Brace and Company
- Media type: Print (Periodical, Hardback)
- Publication date: 1942 (magazine), 1945 (book)

"The Catbird Seat" is a 1942 short story by James Thurber. The story first appeared in The New Yorker on November 14, 1942. The story was also published in the 1945 anthology A Thurber Carnival.

== Synopsis ==
The protagonist is Mr. Martin, a precise, dedicated, vice-free employee of F&S whose habits were once publicly praised by Mr. Fitweiler, "The F at F&S." Martin is being bullied by Mrs. Ulgine Barrows, an unruly, opportunistic Brooklyn Dodgers fan and user of slang (e.g. "tearing up the pea patch").

Ultimately, Barrows wants to re-organize Martin's precious filing department. At first, Martin cannot bear the changes and copes by plotting a way to "rub out" Mrs. Barrows; ultimately, he decides instead to make it seem like she has lost her mind.

== Popular culture ==
The Oxford English Dictionary attributes the first recorded usage of the phrase catbird seat to this story. Mrs. Barrows likes to use the phrase. Another character, Joey Hart, explains that Mrs. Barrows must have picked up the expression from the baseball broadcaster Red Barber and that to Barber, "sitting in the catbird seat" meant "'sitting pretty,' like a batter with three balls and no strikes on him."

== Film adaptation ==
The 1960 movie The Battle of the Sexes is based on the short story.

== See also ==
- Literary fiction
