= My World and Welcome to It =

American television sitcom (1969–1970)

- Created by: Melville Shavelson
- Based on: Stories, inspirational pieces, cartoons, and things that go bump in the night by James Thurber
- Starring: William Windom; Lisa Gerritsen; Joan Hotchkis; Harold J. Stone; Henry Morgan
- Country of origin: United States
- No. of seasons: 1
- No. of episodes: 26

Production
- Executive producer: Sheldon Leonard
- Producer: Danny Arnold
- Running time: 30 minutes
- Production companies: Sheldon Leonard Productions, in association with NBC

Original release
- Network: NBC
- Release: September 15, 1969 – March 9, 1970

My World... and Welcome to It is an American half-hour television sitcom based on the humor and cartoons of James Thurber.

It starred William Windom as John Monroe, a Thurber-like writer and cartoonist who works for a magazine closely resembling The New Yorker called The Manhattanite. Wry, fanciful and curmudgeonly, Monroe observes and comments on life, to the bemusement of his wife Ellen (Joan Hotchkis) and daughter Lydia (Lisa Gerritsen). Monroe's frequent daydreams and fantasies are usually based on Thurber material.

The series, which ran for one season during the 1969–1970 season on NBC, was created by Mel Shavelson, who wrote and directed the pilot episode and was one of its principal writers. Sheldon Leonard was executive producer. The show's producer, Danny Arnold, co-wrote or directed numerous episodes, and appeared as Santa Claus in "Rally Round the Flag".

== Series description ==
Most episodes open with Monroe arriving in front of the house from the Thurber cartoon "Home," which in the original cartoon has a woman's face on one side of it. In the show, the house is initially house-shaped. The woman's face is often animated to appear, as Ellen says something to John. The "Home" house, without the face, is used as an establishing shot throughout the episodes. Other Thurber cartoons are similarly animated over the course of the series—sometimes in the opening sequence, sometimes later in the episode. The episode "Cristabel" begins with Monroe lying on top of a cartoon doghouse, a reference to the non-Thurber cartoon character Snoopy. Animation for the series was by DePatie-Freleng Enterprises.

Henry Morgan had a recurring role as Philip Jensen, a writer for The Manhattanite, who was based on humorist Robert Benchley. Harold J. Stone played the editor, with whom Monroe is often at odds about the cartoon content. A female writer who appeared in one episode was loosely based on Dorothy Parker. Guest-stars included Lee Meriwether, Paul Ford, Joe Besser, Ray Walston, Craig Stevens, Danny Bonaduce, Talia Shire (as Talia Coppola), Cindy Williams, James Gregory and Noam Pitlik.

Live action adaptations of Thurber's writing were another show staple. For example, "Rally Round the Flag," in which Monroe purchases a very large flag as a gift, is loosely based on a Thurber piece called "There's a Time for Flags". An incident with a policeman in "Cristabel" is an almost verbatim transcription of the Thurber story "The Topaz Cufflinks Mystery". Fables for Our Time is another source, as when John Monroe sees a unicorn in the back yard, a reference to "The Unicorn in the Garden." Many of the episode titles are taken from Thurber's Fables for Our Time (e.g., "The Shrike and the Chipmunks") and other writings ("Rules for a Happy Marriage" and many more).

The character name of John Monroe is Thurber’s alter-ego in his book Owl in the Attic. Monroe and his family first came to television in a 1959 Alcoa Theatre/Goodyear Theatre production called "Cristabel (The Secret Life of John Monroe)" also written by Mel Shavelson. The dog Cristabel was named after a dog Thurber gave to his daughter. John Monroe also appears in a 1961 episode of The DuPont Show with June Allyson called "The Country Mouse", starring Orson Bean. This also uses animated versions of Thurber's cartoons, and the story — cartoonist Monroe struggles to finish his work under the pressures of home and office — that could be regarded as an unofficial pilot for the My World series.

Despite the use of "drawings, stories, inspirational pieces and things that go bump in the night by James Thurber", as stated in the opening credits, the show also contains character and story elements that owe little or nothing to Thurber's work.

Despite many positive reviews, moderate Nielsen ratings (aired opposite Gunsmoke) led NBC to cancel the series after one season and replace it with The Red Skelton Show, which it had poached from CBS. It won an Emmy Award for Outstanding Comedy Series and Windom for Outstanding Continued Performance by an Actor in a Leading Role in a Comedy Series.

CBS reran My World and Welcome to It in the summer of 1972. Airings of the show after that were rare, as it was never syndicated nationally. Currently, the series has not been distributed on DVD, although bootlegs exist.

== Episodes ==
No.	Title	Directed by	Written by	Original release date
1	"Man Against the World"	Melville Shavelson	Melville Shavelson	September 15, 1969
John Monroe's wildly imaginative story of Grant and Lee brings a home visit from his daughter's teacher.
2	"The Disenchanted"	Danny Arnold	Ruth Brooks Flippen	September 22, 1969
Lydia runs away after her father refuses to have her seat changed at school.
3	"Little Girls Are Sugar & Spice - And Not Always Nice!"	Lee Philips	Rick Mittleman	September 29, 1969
Facing defeat in a chess match with Lydia, John envisions three ways out, each of which would make newspaper headlines.
4	"Christabel"	Sheldon Leonard	Melville Shavelson	October 6, 1969
John's magazine article gets him in trouble with his family, his editor and police.
5	"The Night the House Caught Fire"	Melville Shavelson	Melville Shavelson	October 13, 1969
John retreats into the past to recall the time his sniffles brought out the town's fire department.
6	"The Ghost and Mr. Monroe"	Danny Arnold	Carl Kleinschmitt	October 20, 1969
Payless after quitting his job in a huff, fantasy-prone John finds himself begging stock market tips from financial wizard (J. P. Morgan).
7	"Nobody Ever Kills Dragons Anymore"	John Rich	Phil Sharp	October 27, 1969
Eleven pickle forks become objects of international intrigue as John escapes into a world of fantasy.
8	"Seal in the Bedroom"	Lee Philips	Paul Wayne	November 3, 1969
John's imagination goes wild when his mother arrives for a visit after his cartoon is rejected by his editor.
9	"The Saga of Dimity Ann"	John Rich	Harvey Bullock and R. S. Allen	November 10, 1969
John secretly abandons the family cat after it nips him on the neck and finger.
10	"A Friend of the Earth"	Hal Cooper	Paul Wayne	November 17, 1969
John is miffed when his wife and daughter prefer the town character's witticism to his brand of humor.
11	"Maid in Connecticut"	James Sheldon	Tom Koch	November 24, 1969
During his wife's vacation, John's life is complicated by a new maid, who has a deathly fear of new appliances.
12	"Native Wit"	Hal Cooper	Marion Hargrove	December 1, 1969
John and his friend Phil Jensen match wits with the village wit in an attempt to send him packing.
13	"The Shrike and the Chipmunks"	Sheldon Leonard	Marion Hargrove	December 8, 1969
John is forced to collaborate with one of the most famous authors of children's books.
14	"Rally Round the Flag"	James Sheldon	Laurence Marks	December 15, 1969
John gives his daughter an unusual Christmas gift and incurs the wrath of the neighborhood.
15	"The War Between Men and Women"	Alan Rafkin	Rick Mittleman	December 22, 1969
A spilled martini triggers an outbreak of hostilities among friends at the Monroes' party.
16	"The Mating Dance"	Sheldon Leonard	John McGreevey	December 29, 1969
When a bully uses brute force to take Lydia to a party by beating up her scheduled escort, John leaps to the defense of the weaker fellow.
17	"Darn that Dream"	John Rich	Lila Garrett & Bernie Kahn	January 5, 1970
John recalls childhood fantasies in his attempt to explain to Lydia that nightmares run in the family.
18	"The Human Being and the Dinosaur"	Alan Rafkin	Laurence Marks	January 12, 1970
John attempts to explain to Lydia why inferior viewpoints must sometimes be tolerated.
19	"Dear Is a Four-Letter Word"	John Rich	Erik Tarloff & Frank Tarloff (Note: Credited as David Adler)	January 19, 1970
Ellen insists that a communications gap exists between her husband and their daughter and asks John to seek advice from the school principal.
20	"The Middle Years"	Danny Arnold	Danny Arnold & Ruth Brooks Flippen	January 26, 1970
Left alone at home when his wife and daughter head for the mountains, John daydreams about an attractive neighbor.
21	"Rules for a Happy Marriage"	John Rich	Rick Mittleman	February 2, 1970
John becomes engrossed in a conversation about the shortcomings of wives and forgets to keep his lunch date with Ellen.
22	"The Wooing of Mr. Monroe"	James Sheldon	Laurence Marks	February 9, 1970
John's collaboration on a book with a woman at her apartment is turned into a romantic situation by his wife.
23	"The Mea-Culpa Bit"	John Rich	Bill Manhoff	February 16, 1970
Several people try to take the blame for the broken arm suffered by Lydia when her father chased her out of his study.
24	"The Fourth Estate"	John Rich	Lila Garrett & Bernie Kahn	February 23, 1970
John is shaken when a sixth grade school newspaper editor rejects two of his cartoons.
25	"Monroe the Misogynist"	Allen Baron	Stan Cutler and Martin Donovan	March 2, 1970
Both Ellen and his editor Hamilton Greeley, accuse John of being a woman-hater.
26	"Child's Play"	John Rich	Carl Kleinschmitt	March 9, 1970
John's disgust at a friend's patronization of his son turns into guilt feelings when he forgets a picnic date with his daughter.

== Awards ==
My World and Welcome to It won two Emmy Awards in 1970:

- Outstanding Continued Performance by an Actor in a Leading Role in a Comedy Series (William Windom)
- Outstanding Comedy Series

It was also nominated for Outstanding Achievement in any area of Creative Arts ("Rally 'Round the Flag Boys" — special photographic effects).

== Book ==
My World — And Welcome To It
- Author: James Thurber
- Illustrator: James Thurber
- Cover artist: James Thurber
- Language: English
- Genre: humor
- Publisher: Harcourt, Brace and Company
- Publication date: October, 1942
- Publication place: United States
- Media type: Print (Hardback & Paperback)
- Pages: 324 pages
- Preceded by: Fables For Our Time and Famous Poems Illustrated
- Followed by: Many Moons

The similarly-titled book by James Thurber, My World — And Welcome to It, was published in 1942 by Harcourt, Brace and Company. The current edition is ISBN 0-89190-269-4. Part One of this collection contains 22 assorted Thurber short stories and humorous essays, many of them illustrated with his cartoons. Part Two consists of an eight-part comic memoir about France, written in 1937 and 1938, about twenty years after Thurber first arrived there near the conclusion of World War I. None of these stories, however, feature any of Thurber's "Monroe Family" characters.

The tone of these pieces ranges from lighthearted wordplay and dialect ("What Do You Mean It Was Brillig?") to literary satire ("The Macbeth Murder Mystery") to psychological horror ("The Whip-Poor-Will" and "A Friend to Alexander"). The most famous story is "The Secret Life of Walter Mitty," which bears little resemblance to the 1947 film of the same name.
