= The Last Flower =

Short story by James Thurber

First edition (publ. Harper & Brothers)

The Last Flower is an anti-war short story written and illustrated by James Thurber's own drawings; it deals with themes of war, peace, love, and resilience.

This short parable was originally published in November 1939, two months after World War II officially began. It was ahead of its time as an early graphic novel.

== Inspiration and reviews ==
The Last Flower was written as Thurber began to realize the sorrow and chaos of war, as can be read via the dedication to his only child "in the wistful hope that her world will be better than mine."

The Houghton Mifflin Chronology of US Literature (2004) gives other details for the inspiration for the book and the eventual moral; it states that the book was "inspired by the Spanish Civil War and the Nazi and Soviet invasion of Poland. Thurber presents a parable of the folly of war in which the only survivors of World War XII are a man, a woman, and a flower. From these three love emerges, leading to family, tribe, civilization, and inevitably, another war."

While at the New York Algonquin Hotel, Thurber wrote and drew The Last Flower on their yellow paper. Both the writer and Helen, his wife, considered it to be the favorite of his twenty-six books. The book was an immediate success.

The New York Times called it "One of the most serious and yet one of the most hilarious contributions on war." (citation o/s)

E. B. White wrote in a The New Yorker feature article of November 11, 1961, "In it you will find Thurber’s faith in the renewal of life, his feeling for the beauty and fragility of life on earth." He also wrote "Of all the flowers, real and figurative...the one that will remain fresh and wilt-proof is the little flower...on the last page of that lovely book."

The novelist Ellen Glasgow, captivated by the book, wrote to Thurber, "I found that I had forgotten your wonderful birds. How is it possible to put so much expression into a single curve?"

Thurber's work "began where the other cartoonists left off," claimed the German artist George Grosz. It was rumored that Henri Matisse said, "the only good artist in New York is a man named Thurber."

It was translated into French by Albert Camus and published by Gallimard in 1952.

=== Other media ===
Thurber's story was animated as part of the climax of Jack Lemmon's 1972 film The War Between Men and Women, the film takes much from Thurber's life and stories. Lemmon's character - based strongly on Thurber himself - tries to show what creativity means to his stepdaughter using The Last Flower as the example. The story does have similarities to the protest song "Where Have All the Flowers Gone?", which offers a similar cycle, even though Thurber's work dates from 1939 and the song was written around 1956 by Pete Seeger; Seeger's song was inspired by a short piece in And Quiet Flows the Don the novel by Mikhail Sholokhov.

Bertold Hummel and Klaus Meyer (Op 55a) put together a short ballet in 1975 based on The Last Flower. Their wording for the first scene and pas de deux is as follows:

"Once again a dictator comes on the scene with his lackeys.
They demonstrate their brutality and begin the war.
The works of mankind are destroyed.
And no-one wants to live any longer with the exception of a flower.
This flower awakes in the girl and the man a joy in living again."

On Thurber's tombstone at Green Lawn Cemetery in Columbus, Ohio, a version of The Last Flower is etched.

== Synopsis ==
After World War XII civilization has collapsed. All the groves and gardens have been destroyed, dogs have run away from their masters, and in all the world there is no trace of love. Suddenly, one day, a young girl comes across something she does not recognize - a flower - the last one in the world.

== Sources ==
Last Flower – 1939, University of Iowa re-issued 2007 ISBN 978-1-58729-620-8 Also by Wooster Books (1998) with detailed jacket notes by David Weisenberg ISBN 978-1-888683-45-5

== Bibliography ==
- Thurber, James (2007). The Last Flower : a parable in pictures (University of Iowa Press ed.). Iowa City: University of Iowa Press. ISBN 978-1-58729-620-8.
