= The White Deer =

Novel by James Thurber

The White Deer is a 96 page children's novel written by James Thurber in 1945. It is a fairy tale about the quest of the three sons of King Clode – Thag and Gallow, the hunters, and Jorn, the poet – who are set perilous tasks to win the heart and hand of a princess who had once been a beautiful white deer, but lost her memories.

== Plot ==
First edition (publ. Harcourt Brace)

The book begins with a description of the enchanted forest, which was supposed to sit between Moonstone Mines and Centaurs Mountain. The enchanted forest also had "a distant bell that causes boys to run and laugh and girls to stand and tremble." The toadstools would feel heavy in a person's hand but would become light enough to float away and trail black and purple stars. Rabbits could even pull their heads off of their bodies and tip them as if they were hats.

King Clode and his sons, Tag and Gallow, would take sport in hunting, while the youngest son, Jorn, would rather play his lyre and create poetic verses. King Clode told a story to his sons about how he, his father, and two brothers were out hunting and almost shot a deer at Centaurs Mountain, but the deer transformed into a princess. The princess was under an enchantment caused by an old woman who was jealous of her beauty. King Clode and his father and brothers returned the princess to her father in the north, and the king and queen celebrated their daughters return with feasting.

In the princess’ country, tradition allowed the princess to set each of her rescuers a task to win her hand. Clode's brother Cloon was assigned a dangerous task which killed him; Clode's second brother was assigned an infeasible task from which he never returned. Clode was to fetch a large diamond from a creature "half dragon and half roc." Clode succeeded after finding that the monster was made of boxwood and clay. Clode wed the princess, who became Tag, Gallow, and Jorn's mother and she died not long after Jorn's birth.

The minstrel in the castle sang of a white deer that would be found between Centaurs Mountain and Moonstone Mines. King Clode decided to hunt the white deer and see if it was a maiden under enchantment or an ordinary deer that could be killed for venison. The king and his three sons rode to the enchanted forest and encountered a woods wizard that looked familiar to Clode. The wizard lifted up snowflakes from the ground, and the snowflakes turned into fireflies. In the midst of the fireflies, the white deer appeared and ran into the forest with the king and his sons in pursuit. The king and his sons pursued the white deer until the deer stopped at Centaurs Mountain. The deer transformed into a dark young woman dressed in a white robe and golden sandals.

When Jorn asked for the maiden's name, the maiden said she did not know. The king decided that they would bring the maiden home. The Royal Recorder at the castle tried to get the princess to remember her father's name by reading aloud all the names in a book of recorded king's names, but the princess couldn't recognize any of the names. The Recorder took the princess to the royal clockmaker, called Tocko, since the Recorder would say that he was "ever a man of shrewd surmise and gifted guesses." Tocko told the recorder to take the princess to a garden with silver fountains so they would observe her. Tocko told the Recorder a story of a deer from his father's time who was friends with a woods wizard. The woods wizard stumbled into a stream and was carried away until the deer rescued him. The wizard, to show his gratitude, gave the deer the ability to transform into a princess when it was cornered by hunters. The deer, after it was changed into a princess at one point, asked the wizard how one remains and lives as a maiden. The wizard enchanted the deer to remain a woman in physical appearance until love fails her three times. If love would fail her three times, she would go back to being a deer forever. Tocko said that the white deer never had a name and only remembered the fields and trees.

The Royal Recorder tried making up king names for the princess to recall, but the king thought it was ridiculous. The king decreed that the princess would send his sons on tasks, and the son that succeeds would marry the princess. He betted that Thag would win the princess and laughed in scorn when Quondo, the dwarf that lived with the royal family, betted that Jorn would win the princess.

The princess commissioned Thag to kill single-handed the Blue Boar of Thedon Grove in the Forest of Jeopardy with one lance. He was then to bring the boar's golden tusks to her. Gallow was commissioned to kill the Seven-Headed Dragon of Dragore guarding the Sacred Sword of Loralow, and he was to bring the sword to the princess. Jorn was merely commissioned to destroy the Mok-Mok, which was a type of scarecrow made out of clay and sandalwood to scare away the rocs who tried to steal the Orchard of Chardor's cherries. Jorn was then to bring back to the princess a silver chalice with a thousand cherries inside.

The Royal Recorder told King Clode Tocko's story of the white deer, while adding a few liberties of his own in the storytelling. In response to the story, Clode said, "Pray God our deer is different from Tocko’s father’s deer.". Clode asked for the History of Sorcery book, in which the Royal Recorder spotted a report of maidens transforming into deer and back. Only in this record, every maiden could remember her name. The Recorder found another record of nine occasions where a deer would change into a woman because she rescued a wizard's life. Plus the wizard wanted to play a trick on men through the deer's enchantment. None of the deer on those nine occasions remembered their names. The spell would not be broken if the deer were loved. "But if love should fail them thrice, they would vanish in a trice," the Recorder said.

After having a weird conversation with a round man sitting in a tree, Prince Thag rode into the Valley of Euphoria. Prince Thag received directions to the Forest of Jeopardy from a trio of men that wore masks (the first a stern face, the second a sad face, and the third a solemn face). Prince Thag accomplished his mission easily by killing the Blue Boar with his lance and cutting off his tusks.

Prince Gallow received directions from a man in blue to get to the Seven-Headed Dragon of Dragore. Gallow accomplished his mission when he encountered a man "dressed in black and blue" that gave him seven balls for the price of twelve emeralds. To get the Sacred Sword of Loralow, all he had to do was to play a type of carnival game of throwing a ball into each of the seven heads of the mechanical Seven-Headed Dragon of Dragore (who was sitting in a tent). The dragon was not wound by a key for its heads to go round and round, so Gallow threw the balls into the still dragon heads and won the sword.

Jorn found the Mok-Mok, but it was already destroyed. He found a tree where instead of cherries hung rubies that couldn't be plucked. A strange, small man appeared and told him to get a ruby from the tree, he had to say one thousand. At first, Jorn thought he had to count to one thousand for a ruby to fall, but the small man made him realize that all he had to do was say the words "one thousand" for a ruby to fall. Jorn filled the silver chalice, but the small man disappeared and a black knight called Duff of the Dolorous Doom appeared before him. They engaged in a sword fight and battled until Jorn stabbed the knight near the right shoulder. When Duff fell, his helmet fell off and revealed the face of an old man. Feeling regret for his action, Jorn helped Duff and tended the wound. Duff told him about how he came face-to-face with the Mok-Mok on a quest to win a woman's love and was appalled that the Mok-Mok was just a harmless thing of clay and wood. "This is the Dolorous Doom of one who rode not home to claim his lady’s hand – that each and every Maytime till I die, I must be overthrown by love which once I overthrew," Duff said. His lady cast a spell on Duff so that his armor is Strength, but the flaw underneath is Pride. Jorn gathered the rubies in the chalice and rode back to the castle.

Clode, Tocko the clockmaker, the Royal Recorder, and the Royal Physician drew to the conclusion that the Princess was in fact a deer in human form. The Princess decided to tell the princes the true story of her identity when they return. Thag, Gallow, and Jorn came to the castle and claimed the Princess’ hand at the same time. The Princess told Thag her true identity first and asked him if he did love her, and the prince broke the golden boar tusks he had brought back with him in protest. The Princess went to Gallow next, and he broke the Sacred Sword of Loralow. The Princess went to Jorn, and Jorn gave her the chalice of rubies and claimed his love for her.

Quondo the dwarf turned into a prince and revealed that he was Tel, the youngest son of the King of Northland. He revealed that the Princess was Princess Rosanore of Northland, his youngest sister. Tel told the story of how a damsel named Nagrom Yaf was sore and jealous about his father marrying another girl. To get back at his father's household, she employed a witch to cast a spell on Princess Rosanore. Rosanore was a deer until a king and his three sons could keep her at bay. Rosanore would not remember her name until a prince would declare his love for her. Tel would be a dwarf that could remember their names but couldn't communicate their story to anyone, but that would change when the Princess’ spell was broken. The wizard Ro, who was the wizard in the forest where the king and princes found Rosanore as a deer, was in the disguise of the minstrel that sang the story of the deer to the king and princes. This explained why he looked familiar to Clode. That same wizard would be in disguises to guide the princes through their missions. The wizard might have been the round man sitting in a tree that Thag saw, and he might have also been the man in blue that Gallow saw. The wizard might have also been in the disguise of the small man that told Jorn how to get the rubies from the tree.

Finally, the King, the princes, Rosanore, and Tel went to Northland for a visit. Nagrom Yaf and the witch she employed were struck by lightning and vanished from the face of the earth in the hour that Jorn declared his love for Rosanore.

== Reviews and summaries ==
Summaries of the story state:

- “The White Deer concerns faith in love.
- "Love depends upon the will of lovers to believe in each other despite all obstacles. Though the story is playful, fastpaced, funny, at times satirical and at times absurd, the theme is serious, as are the obstacles thrown up before the lovers. Secrets of the past and fears of the future, prejudices and the lack of imagination, accident and sorcery – all threaten love's survival."
- "For Thurber devotees – not of his peculiar brand of humor, but of his equally personal brand of fantasy. This is a fable – a fairy tale of medieval days and doings, of the white deer who became a Princess and was courted by three sons of King Clode – and who, to determine the winner of her hand, sent each on a perilous labor. And it is Jorn, the youngest, and the one who loved her truly, who succeeds."

== Publishing ==
The original 1945 edition by Harcourt, Brace and Co features black and white illustrations by James Thurber and a cover and four color plates by Don Freeman. The 1968 trade paperback, published by Mariner Books, San Diego, features only the illustrations by Thurber.
