= The Owl in the Attic and Other Perplexities =

1931 book by James Thurber

- First edition
- Author: James Thurber
- Illustrator: James Thurber
- Language: English
- Publisher: Harper and Brothers
- Publication date: 1931
- Publication place: United Kingdom
- Media type: Print
- Pages: 151
- OCLC: 504043017

The Owl in the Attic and Other Perplexities is a book by James Thurber first published in 1931 by Harper and Brothers. It collects a number of short humorous pieces, most of which had appeared in The New Yorker, and an introduction by E. B. White.

== Contents ==
=== Part One: Mr. and Mrs. Monroe ===
A number of short stories featuring Mr. and Mrs. Monroe, containing many autobiographical elements

=== Part Two: The Pet Department ===
"Inspired by the daily pet column in the New York Evening Post" and consisting of a number of short question and answers, each illustrated by a Thurber drawing.

=== Part Three: Ladies and Gentlemen's Guide to Modern English Usage ===
"Inspired by Mr. H. W. Fowler's A Dictionary of Modern English Usage"
