= The Secret Life of Walter Mitty (1947 film) =

1947 film by Norman Z. McLeod

- Theatrical release poster
- Directed by: Norman Z. McLeod
- Screenplay by: Ken Englund; Everett Freeman; Philip Rapp (uncredited)
- Based on: "The Secret Life of Walter Mitty" by James Thurber
- Produced by: Samuel Goldwyn
- Starring: Danny Kaye; Virginia Mayo; Boris Karloff; Fay Bainter; Ann Rutherford
- Cinematography: Lee Garmes
- Edited by: Monica Collingwood
- Music by: Sylvia Fine (songs); David Raksin (score)
- Production company: Samuel Goldwyn Productions
- Distributed by: RKO Radio Pictures
- Release dates: August 4, 1947 (Chicago premiere); September 1, 1947 (United States)
- Running time: 110 minutes
- Country: United States
- Language: English
- Box office: $3,350,000 (US and Canada rentals)

The Secret Life of Walter Mitty is a 1947 American Technicolor adventure comedy film directed by Norman Z. McLeod from a screenplay by Ken Englund, Everett Freeman, and Philip Rapp (uncredited), loosely based on the 1939 short story by James Thurber. The film stars Danny Kaye as a young daydreaming proofreader for a magazine publishing firm and Virginia Mayo as the woman of his dreams.

== Plot ==
Walter Mitty is a kind but mild man, henpecked and harassed by his overbearing mother, his idea-stealing boss Bruce Pierce, his dimwitted fiancée Gertrude, Gertrude's obnoxious would-be suitor Tubby, and Gertrude's loud-mouthed mother. Walter escapes their incessant needling by imagining himself leading exciting lives, fueled by the pulp magazines he proofreads at the Pierce Publishing Company in Manhattan. These daydreams frequently cause him trouble.

On a train, Walter is surprised when a woman sits beside him who looks exactly like the woman from his daydreams. Nervous about a man following her, she kisses Walter and calls him "darling" on the train and again as she draws him into a taxi. She introduces herself as Rosalind van Hoorn and asks him to accompany her. Rosalind meets Karl Maasdam, who has just arrived from Holland; he hides a black notebook in Walter's briefcase. As they all drive away, Maasdam is discovered to be dead from a stab wound. Walter tries to report the death to the police, but the taxi leaves and Walter's claims are dismissed. Walter fares worse when he arrives late to work and Pierce puts him on notice.

Walter leaves work at lunchtime and finds Rosalind waiting. She explains that she left the police station on instructions from her uncle, Peter, and brings Walter to his mansion. It is explained to Walter that Maasdam was delivering a book, now missing, which contained the locations of the great national art treasures of the Netherlands, secretly hidden before the Germans invaded. They state that the ruthless Wilhelm "The Boot" Krug is after the book, and that the FBI has been informed. Peter warns that Walter's life is in danger and that he should maintain secrecy to protect his loved ones.

Performing an errand in a department store, Walter realizes that he has the little black book. He sees the man who followed Rosalind and escapes into the lingerie department where he hides the book in a corset, which is then taken away for a delivery. Returning to work, Walter is further unnerved when a mysterious Dr. Hollingshead pitches him grisly murder methods. Holligshead steals Walter's memo book, mistaking it for the black book, and pushes Walter out a window. Walter pulls himself onto the ledge and enters Pierce's office window during a board meeting, causing a scene.

Walter returns home and Gertrude and her mother arrive for dinner, bringing uninvited guest Tubby Wadsworth who undermines Walter while vying for Gertrude's affection. In a daydream fantasy, Walter bests Tubby in a contest and wins gentlemanly rights to pursue the affection of "Miss Gertrude", who appears like Rosalind.

The next day, Walter and Rosalind track the corset delivery. Rosalind retrieves the black book backstage at a fashion show and passes it to Walter. That night, they bring the book to Peter, but Rosalind becomes suspicious when she notices Maasdam's passport. She hides the book and tries to get Walter to leave, but Peter drugs him and he falls unconscious. Rosalind realizes that the man she thought was her uncle is actually The Boot. (Note: Rosalind later explains that she had never met her uncle before and had been fooled by The Boot. Maasdam had expressed his disbelief that Peter van Hoorn was still alive, suggesting that he had been caught by the Germans.)

When Walter awakens, his mother and Pierce are there, and Peter claims that he has no niece and that Walter was found in his garden acting erratically. Based on Walter's behavior, his mother and Pierce take him to a psychiatrist of Peter's recommendation: Hollingshead. While initially distrustful, Walter begins to confide in the "psychiatrist" who uses theatrics to convince Walter that his adventures with Rosalind were only a series of daydreams.

Walter and Gertrude's marriage ceremony is held. When Walter reaches into his pocket for the wedding ring, he finds a golden clog charm that Rosalind had given him, realizing that she is real. Walter races to the mansion to save Rosalind. The Boot and his henchmen allow Walter to reach her then capture them both, hoping to threaten them to get the book. However, the police arrive, followed by Pierce, Walter's mother, Gertrude, and Tubby, who deride Walter and Rosalind. Walter stands up to them, impressing Pierce with his assertiveness. Later, newlyweds Walter and Rosalind Mitty are shown his new office with a promotion to associate editor at Pierce Publishing.

== Cast ==
- Danny Kaye as Walter Mitty
- Virginia Mayo as Rosalind van Hoorn
- Boris Karloff as Dr. Hollingshead
- Fay Bainter as Mrs. Eunice Mitty
- Ann Rutherford as Gertrude Griswald
- Thurston Hall as Bruce Pierce
- Gordon Jones as Tubby Wadsworth
- Florence Bates as Mrs. Griswald
- Konstantin Shayne as Peter van Hoorn
- Reginald Denny as colonel
- Henry Corden as Hendrick
- Doris Lloyd as Mrs. Leticia Follinsbee
- Fritz Feld as Anatole
- Frank Reicher as Maasdam
- Milton Parsons as the butler
- The Goldwyn Girls as themselves
- Ethan Laidlaw as helmsman (uncredited)
- Sam McDaniel as doorman (uncredited)
- Charles Trowbridge as Dr. Renshaw (uncredited)

== Production ==
Ken Englund and Everett Freeman reportedly began work adapting James Thurber's story in January 1945. According to Thurber, producer Samuel Goldwyn rejected the Englund and Freeman script in December 1945, and sent Englund to consult with Thurber, who worked with him for ten days. Thurber later complained that at one time the psychiatrist scene contained "a bathing girl incident which will haunt me all the days of my life." He was repeatedly consulted by Goldwyn, but his suggestions were largely ignored. In a letter to Life magazine, Thurber expressed his considerable dissatisfaction with the script, even as Goldwyn insisted in another letter that Thurber approved of it. Thurber also mentioned that Goldwyn asked him not to read part of the script, because it was "too blood and thirsty." Thurber said that he read the entire script anyway, and was "horror and struck".

In moving away from Thurber's material, Goldwyn instead had the writers customize the film to showcase Kaye's talents, altering the original story so much that Thurber called the film "The Public Life of Danny Kaye".

Goldwyn also briefly changed the film's title to I Wake Up Dreaming in response to a Gallup poll he had commissioned, a title that was actually a word play on the 1941 Steve Fisher novel I Wake Up Screaming (and the 1941 film of the same name). However, Goldwyn soon changed it back to Thurber's title in response to the angry protests of Thurber fans, as reported in a May 1947 article in Collier's Weekly.

The film includes many of Kaye's trademark patter songs and one of his best-remembered dream characters, "Anatole of Paris", a fey women's milliner whose inspiration for the ridiculous chapeaux he creates is in actuality his loathing of women. The Anatole character is based on Antoine de Paris, a women's hair-salon professional of the era, known for creating preposterous hairstyles. The lyrics to the song "Anatole of Paris" were written by Kaye's wife, Sylvia Fine.

== Reception ==
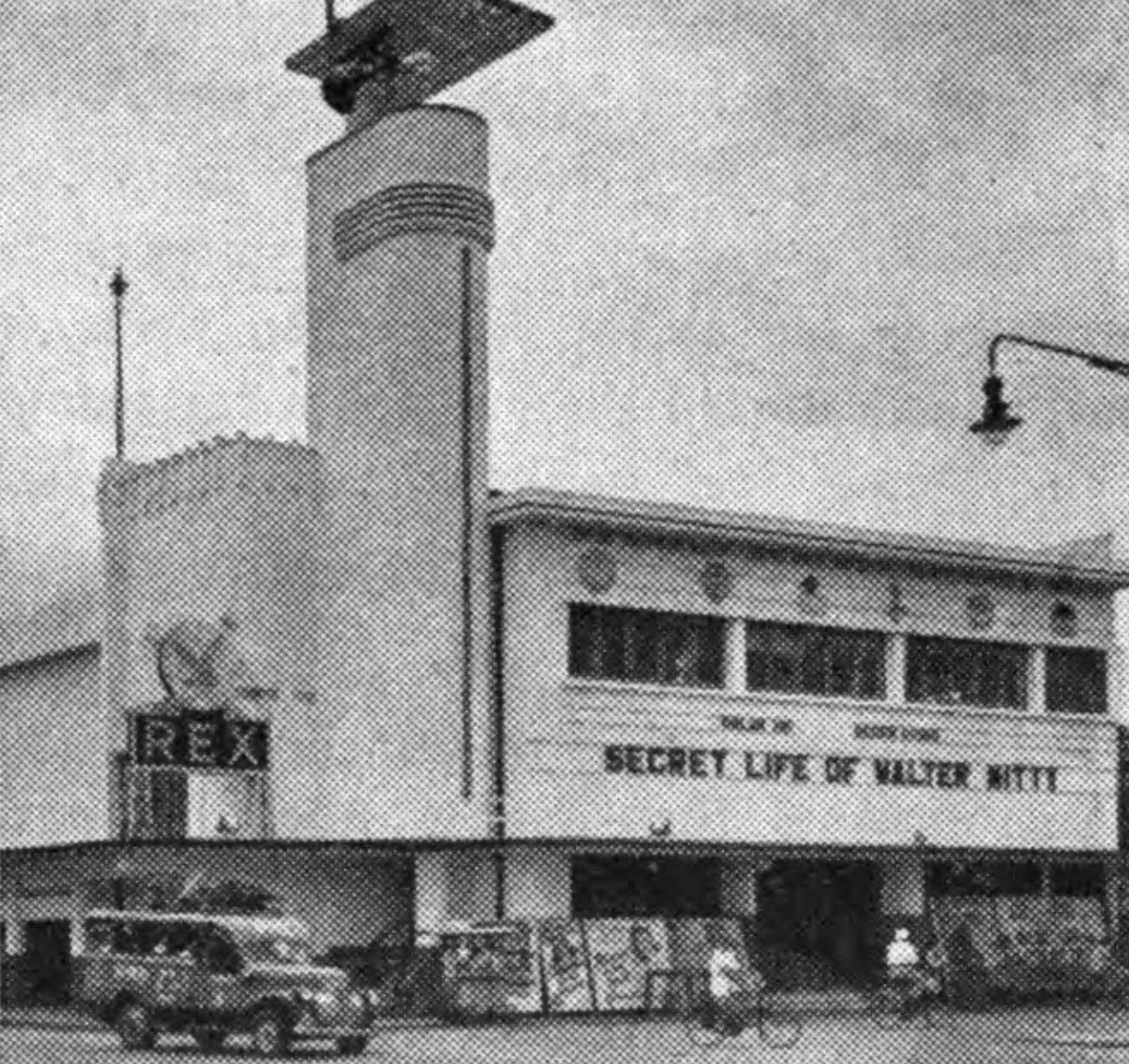
A screening in Medan, Indonesia (1953)

In The Nation in 1947, critic James Agee wrote, " ... quite an entertaining movie. I am getting a little wan about Danny Kaye's tonsil-juggling numbers, but ... at moments during the daydreams Kaye is wonderful. He is so good at his best that it is hard to forgive—or even believe—all that he mishandles." British critic Leslie Halliwell stated, "This pleasantly remembered star comedy, though it never had much to do with Thurber, can now be seen to have missed most of its opportunities, though the nice moments do tend to compensate." Halliwell explains further: "But it still seems odd for a film to have dated so badly that we are now chiefly conscious of its faults when once we saw nothing but its virtues ... Perhaps the key to the fading fortunes of this film is that Danny Kaye's own talent, which then shimmered so brightly, now looks decidedly overblown; ... a little of his gesticulating gibberish goes a long way. Still, he was always a performer of precision ..." Critic Pauline Kael stated, "Worse than there's any excuse for ... Kaye is often very funny—fantasizing himself as a grim-faced captain battling a typhoon or as an eminent surgeon saving a patient's life—but when the picture gets derailed and he starts chasing crooks, it's tedious."

The Secret Life of Walter Mitty ranks 479th on Empire magazine's 2008 list of "The 500 Greatest Movies of All Time".

== Adaptations to other media ==
The Secret Life of Walter Mitty was dramatized as a half-hour radio play on the November 3, 1947, broadcast of The Screen Guild Theater with Kaye and Mayo in their original film roles.

== Remake ==
Plans to remake The Secret Life of Walter Mitty arose in the early 1990s, with producer Samuel Goldwyn Jr. considering actor Jim Carrey for the starring role. After development that spanned over two decades, the film finally came to fruition with Ben Stiller as the lead actor and the director. The film was released in the United States on December 25, 2013.

== See also ==
- List of American films of 1947
- Boris Karloff filmography
