= The Secret Life of Walter Mitty =

1939 short story by James Thurber

- Short story by James Thurber
- Country: United States
- Language: English
- Genre: short story

Publication
- Published in: The New Yorker
- Publication type: Magazine
- Publisher: Harcourt, Brace and Company
- Media type: Print (Periodical, hardback and paperback)
- Publication date: 1939 (magazine), 1942 (book)

Chronology
Death in the Zoo	Interview with a Lemming

"The Secret Life of Walter Mitty" (1939) is a short story by James Thurber. The most famous of Thurber's stories, it first appeared in The New Yorker on March 18, 1939, and was first collected in his book My World and Welcome to It (Harcourt, Brace and Company, 1942). It has since been reprinted in James Thurber: Writings and Drawings (The Library of America, 1996, ISBN 1-883011-22-1), is available on-line on the New Yorker website, and is one of the most anthologized short stories in American literature. The story is considered one of Thurber's "acknowledged masterpieces". It was made into a 1947 film, with Danny Kaye in the title role, though the film is very different from the original story. It was also adapted into a 2013 film, directed by and starring Ben Stiller, and is again very different from the original.

The name Walter Mitty and the derivative word "Mittyesque" have entered the English language, denoting an ineffectual person who spends more time in heroic daydreams than paying attention to the real world, or more seriously, one who intentionally attempts to mislead or convince others that he is something that he is not.

== Plot ==
The short story deals with a vague and mild-mannered man who drives into Waterbury, Connecticut, with his wife for their regular weekly shopping and his wife's visit to the beauty parlor. During this time he has five heroic daydream episodes, each inspired by some detail of his mundane surroundings. The first is as a pilot of a U.S. Navy flying boat in a storm, followed by Mrs. Mitty's complaint that Mitty is "driving too fast". As he drives past a hospital, he imagines himself a magnificent surgeon performing a one-of-a-kind surgery. Later, a newsboy shouting about the "Waterbury Trial" begins Mitty's third fantasy, as a deadly assassin testifying in a courtroom. While waiting for his wife, he picks up an old copy of Liberty, reading "Can Germany Conquer the World Through the Air?", and begins his fourth daydream, as a Royal Air Force pilot volunteering for a daring suicide mission to bomb an ammunition dump. As the story ends, Mitty stands against a wall, smoking, and imagines himself facing a firing squad, "inscrutable to the last."

== Analysis ==
Mitty has been identified as typifying the protagonists found in Thurber's other works, so much so that he has been called "the archetype for dreamy, hapless, Thurber Man". Like many of his male characters, such as the husband in "The Unicorn in the Garden" and the physically unimposing men Thurber often paired with larger women in his cartoons, Mitty is dominated and put upon by his wife. Like the man who saw the unicorn, he escapes via fantasies. A similar dynamic is found in the Thurber story "The Curb in the Sky", in which a man starts recounting his own dreams as anecdotes as an attempt to stop his wife from constantly correcting him on the details.

In his book The Man Who Was Walter Mitty: The Life and Work of James Thurber (2000), author Thomas Fensch suggests that the character was largely based on Thurber himself. This is consistent with Thurber's self-described imaginative interpretations of shapes seen with his "two-fifths vision" in his essay "The Admiral on the Wheel". Neurologist V.S. Ramachandran suggests that Thurber may have had Charles Bonnet syndrome, a neurological condition that causes vivid and bizarre hallucinations in blind people.

Thurber's love of wordplay can be seen in his coining of several nonsense terms in the story, including the pseudo-medical jargon "obstreosis of the ductal tract", "streptothricosis", and the recurring onomatopoeia of "ta-pocketa-pocketa-pocketa." The medical nonsense that "coreopsis has set in" uses the name of a flower which sounds vaguely like a horrible medical condition.

== 1947 film ==
The story was made into a 1947 film starring Danny Kaye as a young daydreaming editor of pulp magazines. The film was adapted for the screen by Ken Englund, Everett Freeman, and Philip Rapp, and directed by Norman Z. McLeod. It was filmed in Technicolor.

Thurber was repeatedly consulted about the film's script, but his suggestions were largely ignored by producer Samuel Goldwyn, who had the writers alter the original story to showcase Kaye's talents. In a letter to Life magazine, Thurber expressed his considerable dissatisfaction with the script, even as Goldwyn insisted in another letter that Thurber approved of it.

A 1947 radio adaptation of the film, with Danny Kaye and Virginia Mayo reprising their roles, was performed on The Screen Guild Theater. Because the show was a half hour, including commercials, Kaye's extraneous routines are minimized, making it more like the original story. Even closer to the original story is a 1944 radio adaptation from This Is My Best, with Robert Benchley as the daydreaming Mitty.

== 2013 film ==
20th Century Fox produced and Ben Stiller directed another film adaptation in 2013, which also differs widely from the book. Stiller stars as Mitty, with Kristen Wiig, Shirley MacLaine, Patton Oswalt, Adam Scott, Kathryn Hahn, and Sean Penn also appearing in the film. The film was released on December 25, 2013, in the US and in other countries and had a production budget of $90 million.

== Stage adaptations ==
"The Secret Life of Walter Mitty" was adapted for the stage by Thurber as part of the 1960 Broadway theater revue A Thurber Carnival. The sketch, which closed the show except for "Word Dance Part II", was nearly identical to the short story, except that at the end he cleverly avoids being shot. The original cast for the sketch was as follows:

- Peggy Cass as Mrs. Mitty
- Tom Ewell as Walter Mitty
- Paul Ford as Mr. Pritchard-Mitford and The Leader
- John McGiver as Dr. Renshaw
- Wynne Miller as Nurse
- Peter Turgeon as Narrator, Lt. Berg, and Dr. Remington
- Charles Braswell as Dr. Benbow

The story was again adapted for the stage in 1964, this time by Joe Manchester. This musical version of The Secret Life of Walter Mitty depicts Mitty at age 40, tempted by "would-be chanteuse" Willa De Wisp to leave his wife Agnes and really live "the Secret Life". It features 17 songs, with lyrics by Earl Shuman and music by Leon Carr. The musical opened off-Broadway at the Players Theatre on October 26, 1964, and ran for 96 performances. Time magazine referred to the musical's plot as having been "boldly extrapolated" from the short story, and called the result "a thoroughly pleasant musical evening". Columbia Records issued an original cast recording on LP, also dated 1964.

== See also ==
- The Secret Lives of Waldo Kitty
