= James Thurber =

American cartoonist, author, journalist, and playwright (1894–1961)

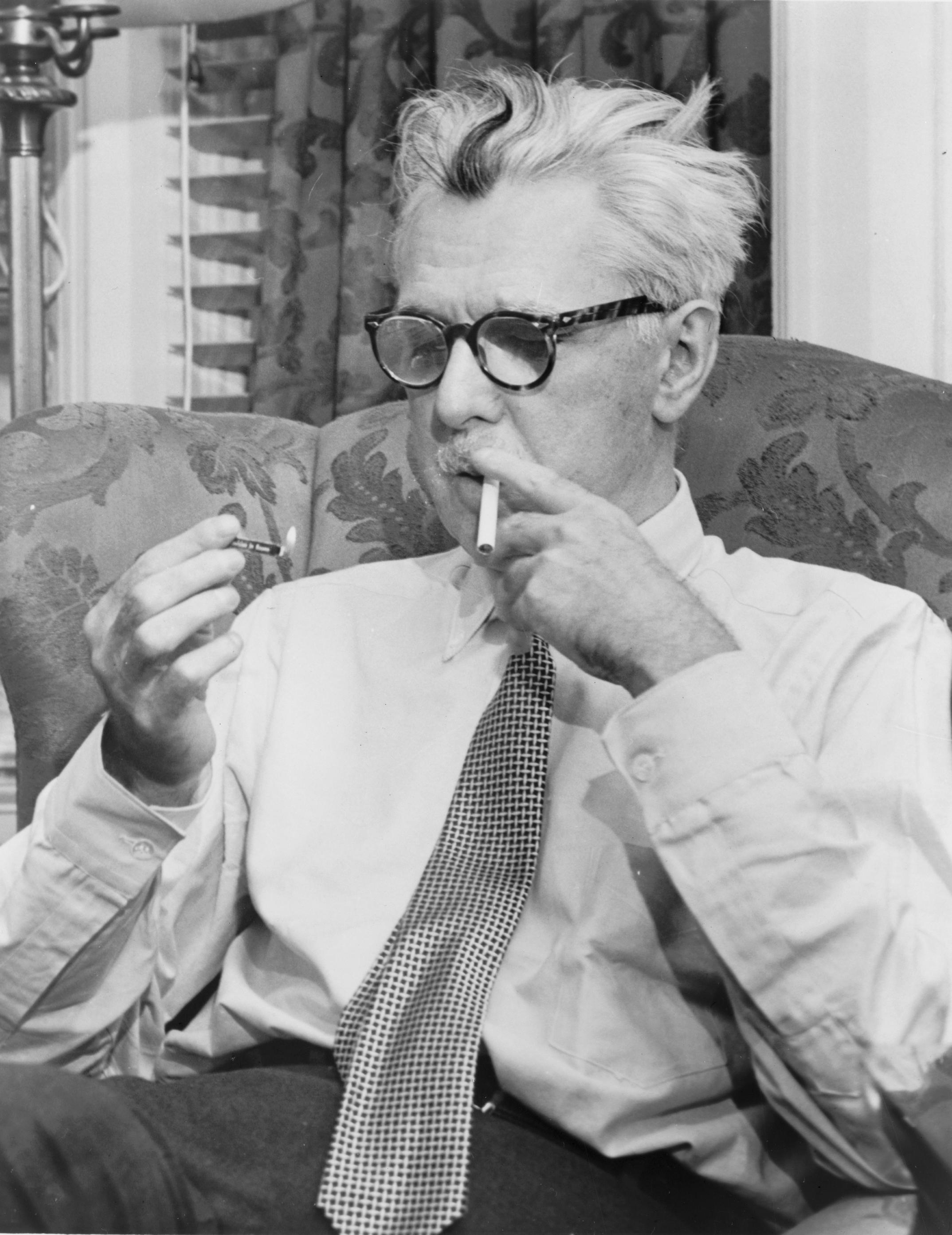
- Thurber in 1954
- Born: James Grover Thurber; December 8, 1894; Columbus, Ohio, U.S.
- Died: November 2, 1961 (aged 66); Manhattan, New York, U.S.
- Occupations: Cartoonist, writer
- Spouses: Althea Adams (m. 1925; div. 1935) Helen Wismer (m. 1935)
- Children: 1

James Grover Thurber (December 8, 1894 – November 2, 1961) was an American cartoonist, writer, humorist, journalist, and playwright. He was born in Columbus, Ohio, and attended Ohio State University (OSU), leaving in 1918 without graduating. He spent over a year in Paris, working for the US State Department as a code clerk, and on his return to Columbus in 1920 was hired as a reporter for the Columbus Dispatch. He married his first wife, Althea Adams, in 1922. Thurber was hired by The New Yorker in early 1927, and soon became a prolific and popular contributor.

With E. B. White he wrote Is Sex Necessary?, a parody of serious psychological books about sex. It included many illustrations by Thurber, and the popularity of these convinced The New Yorker to start printing his cartoons. Over the 1930s several books of his writings and cartoons appeared, including My Life and Hard Times, a collection of reminiscences about Thurber's childhood in Columbus that is often considered his finest work. In 1935 he and Althea divorced, and he immediately remarried, to Helen Wismer. In 1938 he and a college friend, Elliott Nugent, wrote a play, The Male Animal, which had a successful run in 1940 and 1941 and was later made into a film.

Thurber had lost an eye in childhood, and by the late 1930s he was starting to lose vision in his remaining eye. Operations in the early 1940s were unable to save his sight, and he became almost completely blind. He was able to draw until the mid-1940s, and continued to be a productive writer, with The Thurber Carnival, his most successful book, appearing in 1945. In the early 1950s he had thyroid problems that led to emotional instability, which was not brought under control for a couple of years. Later successes included Further Fables for Our Time, a collection of fables most of which could be read as political commentary, which appeared during the McCarthy "red scare" era, and a stage version of The Thurber Carnival, in which he acted for several months in 1959.

He suffered from a series of undiagnosed small strokes during the last year of his life, and died on November 2, 1961, in Manhattan. His ashes are buried in Green Lawn Cemetery in Columbus.

== Early life and career ==
James Grover Thurber (known as "Jamie" to his family) was born in Columbus, Ohio, on December 8, 1894. His father, Charles Leander Thurber, (Note: Charles changed his middle name to "Lincoln" shortly after the marriage.) was a clerk working for the Ohio Republican Party at the time James was born; his wife, Mary Agnes Fisher (known as "Mame") was from a wealthy local family. James was the middle son of three; his older brother, William, was born in 1893, and Robert was born in 1896. In April 1902 Charles moved the family to Washington D.C., and the Thurbers rented a house in Falls Church, Virginia that August. One Sunday while they were in Falls Church, James and William were playing with a bow and arrow in the yard, and William told James to stand facing the fence so William could try to hit him in the back with a blunt arrow. James turned around just as William shot, and the arrow hit James in his left eye. After the initial shock the eye was not very painful, and Mame took James to a local doctor to have it treated. A few days later it was hurting, and Charles and Mame took him to a specialist in Washington, who removed the eye. (Note: Thurber believed in later life that if the eye had been removed promptly he would not have eventually lost the use of his other eye, but according to Harrison Kinney, one of his biographers, this is uncertain.)

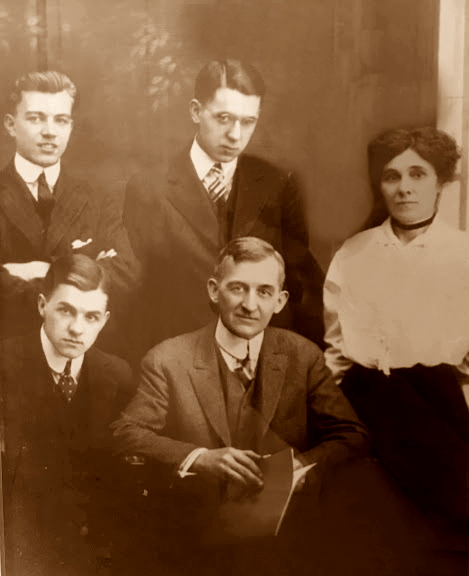
Thurber family portrait taken in Columbus, Ohio, in 1915. From left to right: seated: Robert and Charles. Back row: William, James, and Mame.

The Thurbers moved back to Columbus in June 1903. Charles fell ill in 1904, and when he did not recover quickly the family moved into Mame's parents' house. James hated living there, and arrangements were made for him to stay frequently with Margery Albright, the practical nurse who had attended his birth. Albright was known to the family as Aunt Margery, and between 1905 and 1910 James stayed with her often, sometimes for weeks at a time. James' brother Robert later described Albright as "a second mother" to James. Charles recovered after a few months, and by 1906 the Thurbers were living in Norwich Hotel.

James missed a year of school in Washington. He was enrolled in Sullivant Elementary School in Columbus, a year behind his age group. In third grade he met Eva Prout at Sullivant; they shared classes for the next six years. By the seventh grade he was infatuated with her. Prout left school after the eighth grade to pursue a singing and acting career, and Thurber occasionally saw her in silent movies over the next few years.

Thurber spent seventh and eighth grades at Douglas Junior High School. He was chosen to write the Class Prophecy in 1909—this was a common essay format at the time. Thurber imagined his schoolmates and himself in an adventure in a flying machine, in which the class appears to be doomed, but is surprised "to see James Thurber walking out on the beam", over the side of the plane, to remove a rope that was tangling a piece of equipment. The class "learned that James was a tight-rope walker with Barnsels and Ringbailey's circus". The story includes made-up technical terms such as "hythenometer" and "curobater", and is considered by Thurber scholars to contain the roots of the ideas that would later become Thurber's story "The Secret Life of Walter Mitty".

Thurber attended East High School, starting in September 1909. He was a favorite with the teachers. A classmate recalls him as a "much better [writer] than the rest of us ... He was constantly drawing, and then throwing the drawings away, as if he had no further use for them". His first published story, "The Third Bullet", appeared in the high school magazine, X-rays; it was a western, and showed "not the slightest clue of literary promise", according to his biographer Burton Bernstein. Another biographer, Harrison Kinney, agrees that Thurber showed no sign of literary precocity, and that his high school years were not remarkable in any way. Thurber himself considered that he was a "late bloomer".

=== Ohio State University ===
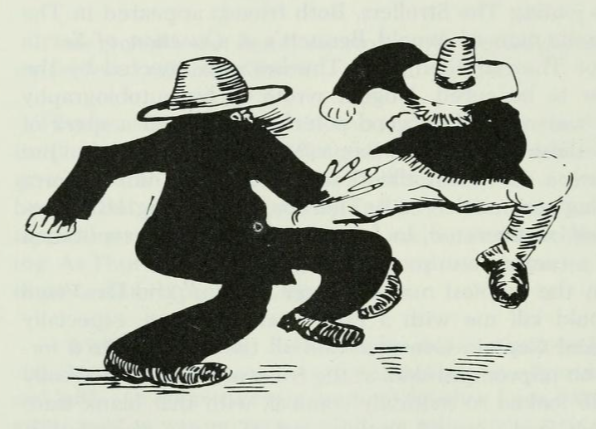
Sketch by Thurber for the Sundial

In about 1913 the Thurbers moved to 77 Jefferson Avenue. (Note: Bernstein says the move was "by 1912", but Kinney says it took place in 1913. The house is now maintained as an arts center and museum.) Thurber graduated from East High in June, and was accepted at Ohio State University, beginning classes in September that year. A highlight of his freshman year was a test given by Albert Weiss, Thurber's psychology professor, which made it apparent that Thurber had an astonishingly good memory. Thurber was proud of his performance and often mentioned it to acquaintances throughout his life. He also took English Composition, which focused on paragraphing, a form of humorous writing popular in newspapers of the day. Robert O. Ryder, the editor of the Ohio State Journal, was a popular paragrapher of the time, and Thurber was a great admirer of his work.

Thurber worked on both the Ohio State student publications: the Sundial, a monthly magazine, and the Ohio State Lantern, a newspaper; and became friends with Elliott Nugent, who was also writing for the Lantern. Nugent was much more successful than Thurber socially, and along with Jack Pierce, another student working on the Lantern, managed to get Thurber accepted into Phi Kappa Psi, one of the most prestigious fraternities at Ohio State. Thurber became editor-in-chief of the Sundial the next academic year (1917–1918), and chose Nugent as his assistant editor. He was called up for military service, and immediately rejected because of his missing eye. Many of his fellow students were now serving in the armed forces, and Thurber wrote much of the Sundial's material himself. Thurber became well-known and well-liked on campus, and both he and Nugent were nominated to Sphinx, an exclusive society for high-profile students. That year Thurber decided to leave OSU—without a degree, as he had not completed the mandatory graduation requirements. In January 1918 he applied for a job with the State Department.

=== State Department ===
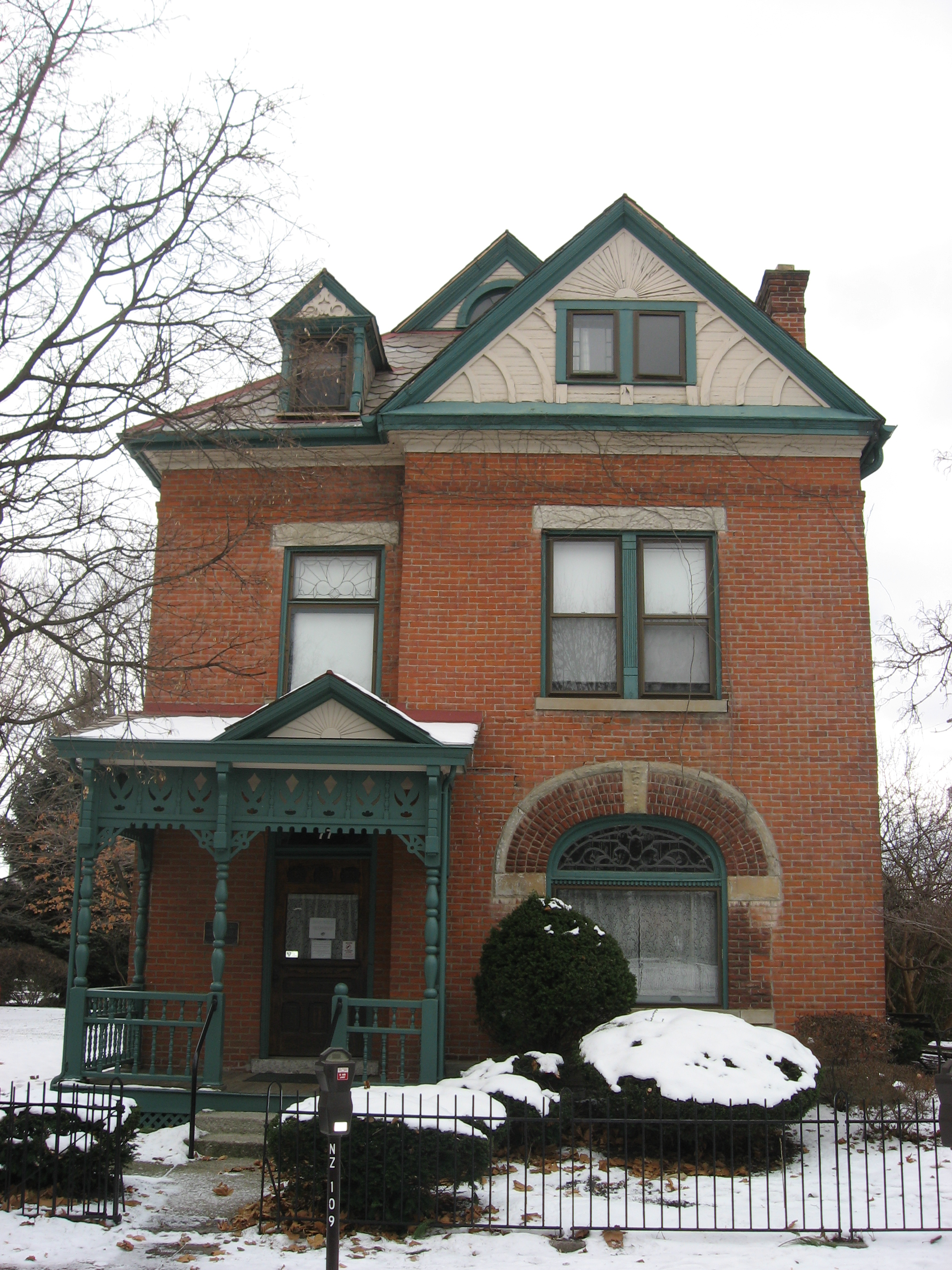
The Thurber House in Columbus, Ohio

Thurber was hired as a code clerk, and moved to Washington, D.C. on June 21, 1918. After several months of training he was assigned to the American Embassy in Paris; he arrived in France on November 13, two days after the Armistice. While in Washington and Paris Thurber corresponded both with Eva Prout, whom he had idealized for years, and with Minnette Fritts, a popular student at Ohio State whom he had dated in Columbus. In one of his letters he asked Prout to marry him; she refused, insisting that they meet in person before she could commit herself. Thurber had become an admirer of Henry James at Ohio State, and had thought of retaining his virginity "for his Jamesian ideal" woman, but he lost his virginity to a Folies Bergère dancer. He was conflicted about his experiences, and came home guilty and depressed. He left Paris in February 1920 and returned to Columbus. Fritts was married by the time Thurber came home, and he began a more intense courtship of Prout, who had quit her acting career because the film industry was much reduced by the war, and was now living in Zanesville, Ohio. By the end of 1920 she had rejected him.

=== Columbus Dispatch and first marriage ===
Thurber worked briefly for the Ohio Department of Agriculture in mid-1920, while considering a return to Ohio State and also applying for newspaper jobs. In August 1920 Thurber was hired as a reporter for The Columbus Dispatch, and after a few weeks was assigned to cover Columbus City Hall. The pay began at $25 a week, and by the time Thurber left in 1924 it had only risen to $40 a week. He took second jobs to augment his income: he was a correspondent for The Christian Science Monitor, and did publicity work for Columbus's Indianola Park and Majestic Theatre.

He became friends with John McNulty, and Joel Sayre, then journalists for the Ohio State Journal, and Herman Miller, who was teaching English at Ohio State University. Miller and Thurber were involved with The Strollers, an Ohio State dramatic society. Thurber was also active in The Scarlet Mask Club, the college's musical theatre group, and wrote and directed (and sometimes performed in) their annual show from 1921 to 1924. He met Althea Adams, an Ohio State student, at The Strollers in 1921. Adams had been elected an Ohio State "Rosebud" and "Magic Mirror", both titles given to accomplished and beautiful women students, and many of Thurber's and Adams' acquaintances thought they were an odd couple when they began dating. (Note: Among the comments on the marriage from their acquaintances were "She was aloof, attractive, ambitious, worldly, and very social—all the things Jim wasn't, particularly" and "Jim had a project going to conquer Althea, which was quite a project since she was an Amazonian woman, both physically and mentally ... A lot of us sat around thunderstruck, trying to figure out how he did it.") They married in May 1922, and spent a honeymoon week as guests of Elliott Nugent and his wife, in Connecticut, where they went to see a play together every night. Neither Thurber nor his new wife was well off, and Thurber reviewed each of the plays for the Dispatch in order to make some extra income.

Starting in early 1923, the Dispatch gave Thurber a half-page every Sunday to write whatever he wanted. He titled the column "Credos and Curios", and filled it with a mixture of literary criticism, humorous writing, verse, and commentary. The column was canceled by the publisher in December, to Thurber's disappointment, and Althea persuaded him to try his hand at writing full time. A friend offered the use of a cottage in Jay, in upstate New York, for the summer, and Thurber left the Dispatch, but his efforts met with little success: he sold one story to The Kansas City Star, and a short piece to the New York World, but The Saturday Evening Post and The American Mercury rejected everything he submitted. The Thurbers returned to Columbus in late 1924. The Dispatch did not rehire Thurber, but he was paid for his work for the Scarlet Mask, and he picked up more publicity work, with the result that he earned more over the next few months than if he had kept his newspaper job.

=== Normandy, Paris, and Nice ===
Althea was still confident that Thurber could succeed as a writer, and in May 1925 the Thurbers left Columbus again, this time for France. They spent several weeks traveling in France, Switzerland, and Italy, sightseeing. In July they rented a cottage in Granville, in Normandy, and Thurber wrote the first five thousand words of a novel. Althea read it, and the two of them agreed it was terrible. He abandoned the manuscript and never tried to write a novel again. The Thurbers initially decided to return to the US, but a pleasant evening at a café in Paris convinced them to stay, and Thurber got a job with the Paris edition of the Chicago Tribune, rewriting stories from French newspapers in English. There was stiff competition among expatriate Americans to work at the Tribune, but Thurber's four years at the Dispatch and his ability to write newspaper headlines got him the job immediately. Among Thurber's colleagues at the Tribune was a young William Shirer, and the two became close friends. Shirer later recalled the material they wrote as "primarily a work of the imagination", since they were given so little material from the original story to work with. Thurber was able to produce a column about Christy Mathewson's career entirely from his knowledge of baseball, when Mathewson died, but on other topics, such as Admiral Richard Byrd's flight over the North Pole, or the history of the Polish złoty, he was less reliable.

Thurber's salary was low, and to supplement it he wrote articles in his off-hours, sending them to his agent in New York. His most prestigious sale was to Harper's Magazine; the money arrived just in time to pay off accumulating debts. Towards the end of the year he was sent to Nice, on the Mediterranean coast, to work on the Tribune's Riviera edition. His assignments included coverage of the tennis match between Helen Wills and Suzanne Lenglen, known as the Match of the Century, and interviewing Isadora Duncan after her husband died—she had not heard of his death and learned of it from Thurber when he met with her. Althea was also now working for the Tribune, as society editor, but despite the extra income they were going further into debt, and Thurber decided he had to return to the US, feeling that his best chance of making a living from writing was in New York. The Thurbers' time on the French Riviera was for a while the most idyllic period of their marriage, but there were problems in the relationship. Althea was more interested in sex than James was, and their sex lives were "a frustration to them both". Althea decided to stay in Nice for a couple of months without James, and eventually returned to the US a couple of months after he sailed for New York. (Note: According to Bernstein, Althea stayed in Nice for two months because the Thurbers' marriage was in trouble, and Althea was attracted to a member of the Tribune staff. Kinney gives Helen Thurber (James's second wife) as the source for this explanation, but also gives Althea's own explanation: that she was waiting until he was earning money, though she expected them then to live "comparatively independent lives".)

=== New York Evening Post ===
Thurber arrived in New York in June 1926, rented an apartment and began submitting his pieces to The New Yorker, which had been launched only a year earlier. Everything he sent in was quickly rejected. He wrote a thirty-thousand-word parody of several bestselling books, but no publishers were interested. (Note: Thurber's manuscript was titled Why We Behave Like Microbe Hunters; it was a parody of Microbe Hunters by Paul de Kruif, Nize Baby by Milt Gross, Gentlemen Prefer Blondes by Anita Loos, and Why We Behave Like Human Beings by George Dorsey.) In Paris in 1925 Thurber had been offered a job at the New York Evening Post, and had turned it down; he was able to get the offer renewed and now accepted it. He also made another substantial sale: a humorous piece that took up half a page of the New York World and brought in $40. Thurber started on the city desk of the Post, and was soon moved to writing feature articles, including interviews with Thomas Edison and the widow of Harry Houdini. He kept trying to sell to The New Yorker, eventually accumulating twenty rejections. One day Althea suggested he set a timer and complete an article in forty-five minutes; he tried it, sent the result to The New Yorker, and it sold immediately.

== 1927–1949: The New Yorker and after ==
In February 1927 Thurber met E. B. White at a party in Greenwich Village. White was working at The New Yorker, and helped Thurber to get hired there. He began as an editor, with long hours, often seven days a week, with very little time for writing. Harold Ross, the editor-in-chief, agreed to "demote" him (as Thurber put it) to a writer instead of an editor later that year. Thurber had produced a handful of short pieces even while working as an editor, and became a mainstay of the magazine once he gave up editorial duties. One of his first sales in this period was "Menaces in May", a short story—not a humorous piece—with heavily autobiographical elements. The protagonist, whose sophisticated wife, Lydia, is away from home, meets an old flame who is married. The protagonist wonders what his life would have been like with her, and later blames Lydia for the dull state of his life. The old flame was based on Eva Prout. This was following by a series of humorous pieces about a Mr. Monroe and his efficient, sophisticated, emasculating wife; each episode was based on something that had happened between James and Althea. The Thurber's marriage was still in difficulties; by the time Thurber was hired by The New Yorker Althea was sleeping with other men, without concealing her affairs from James, and at one point Althea went to Europe without James for two months. In 1929 they agreed to begin living more separate lives: they rented a house in Silvermine, Connecticut, and Althea stayed there; James spent most of his time in Manhattan, visiting Silvermine occasionally.

Thurber's 1932 version of the "Seal in the Bedroom" cartoon

White shared an office with Thurber, and soon became a fan of Thurber's rapidly sketched pencil drawings. In 1929 he picked up a discarded cartoon of Thurber's, of a seal seeing explorers in the distance. He inked in the faint pencil lines and submitted it to the weekly art meeting. It was rejected with a note from the art director saying "This is the way a seal's whiskers go"; White resubmitted it with a note saying "This is the way a Thurber seal's whiskers go", but it was rejected again. At about the same time White and Thurber discovered that they were both working on parodies of serious psychological books about sex. They decided to combine their efforts, writing alternate chapters, and White asked Thurber to create the illustrations. They took the manuscript and drawings to Harper, who had recently published a book of White's. The editor assumed that Thurber's simple sketches were just outlines of the planned final artwork, but White told them "No ... these are the drawings themselves". The book, titled Is Sex Necessary? came out that November, and was very successful, selling fifty thousand copies in its first year in print.

Ross had been surprised to discover that Thurber's drawings were popular, and in 1930 began printing his artwork, in a series of parodies of advice columns about readers' pets. These were collected in 1931 in Thurber's second book, The Owl in the Attic, which also included the Monroe stories and a series of articles that had appeared in The New Yorker parodying H. W. Fowler's Modern English Usage, which had become Ross's favorite style guide. Ross asked Thurber for the seal cartoon, but it had been discarded. Thurber attempted to recreate it, but as he drew it he realized the rock on which the seal sat looked like the headboard of a bed, so he added a couple in bed beneath the headboard, with the caption "All right, have it your own way—you heard a seal bark." The cartoon appeared in The New Yorker in 1932, in the January 30 issue, and became "one of the most celebrated and often-reprinted cartoons of the twentieth century", in Bernstein's words.

In 1931, Althea moved back to Manhattan, and for a short time the marriage seemed healthy, but after a few weeks, James decided to leave Althea and live with Paula Trueman, an actress he had a relationship with. Althea told James she was pregnant, and they agreed to stay together. They bought a farmhouse with twenty acres of land in Sandy Hook, Connecticut, and lived together there. Their daughter, Rosemary, was born in Manhattan on October 7, 1931.

=== Divorce and remarriage ===
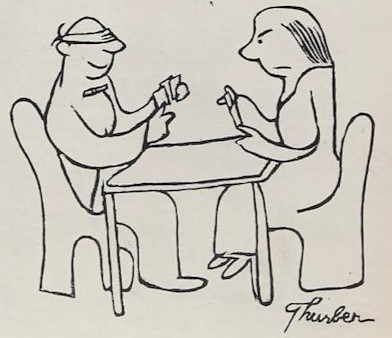
Cartoon drawn on the wall of Costello's, a bar in New York, by Thurber in the 1930s

After the success of the first two books, Harper arranged to publish a collection of Thurber's art, titled The Seal in the Bedroom. Forty-seven of the drawings included had already appeared in The New Yorker, and Thurber quickly drew another thirty-eight to fill out the book. It appeared in November 1932 and sold well. Among the pieces Thurber wrote for The New Yorker was a series about his life in Columbus; these were published in November 1933 in book form, titled My Life and Hard Times. The reviews were positive; the book became a bestseller, and is generally regarded as Thurber's best work. Thurber was in debt to The New Yorker, which had loaned him part of the money to buy the property in Sandy Hook. To raise money he sold his cartoons to an art dealer in Manhattan, and also provided drawings for advertisements, including for the French Line, the American Radiator Company, and Heinz. In 1934 he began a series of radio broadcasts on WABC, filling in for Alexander Woollcott, another New Yorker writer who was in hospital. His art began to receive serious critical attention: in 1933 drawings by Thurber and George Grosz were shown at Smith College, and in 1934 there was a Thurber show at the Valentine Gallery in Manhattan. He also drew many cartoons on the walls of a bar named Costello's on Third Avenue. When the bar relocated to 49th Street in 1949, the walls with his cartoons were carefully moved to the new location to preserve them.

By this time the Thurbers' marriage was foundering again: they agreed that Althea would stay in Sandy Hook, and James would live in Manhattan and occasionally visit. Thurber began to drink more in the wake of his success, and had affairs, one of which was with Helen Wismer, whom he had met in 1930 and dated occasionally since then. In late 1934 Althea filed for divorce. James was surprised, but cooperative, arranging financial support for Althea, giving her the Sandy Hook property, and agreeing a visitation plan for Rosemary. At the time of the divorce, Thurber had heard that Ann Honeycutt, one of the women he had been closest to over the previous few years, was getting married. The day after the divorce Thurber met Helen Wismer for a date, and asked her to marry him. She agreed, acknowledging later that it was "on the rebound" from the relationship with Honeycutt, and they were married on June 25, 1935. They had little money, and honeymooned on Martha's Vineyard in a cottage with no water or power.

In October the Thurbers moved back to an apartment in Manhattan, and for a few months kept up a hectic schedule; James would work all night, stop at the New Yorker offices during the day, and spend the evening in bars; he and Helen would host parties at the apartment or visit others. In November Harper brought out Thurber's The Middle-Aged Man on the Flying Trapeze, which collected pieces from The New Yorker with some additional drawings; again it was a success, with four printings that year. He began a series of non-fiction profiles in The New Yorker under the title "Where Are They Now?"' that ran for two years, published under the pseudonym "Jared L. Manley". The subjects included one-time New York governor William Sulzer, Willie Stevens, one of the suspects in a notorious murder case, and Virginia O'Hanlon, famous for writing the letter that led to the "Yes, Virginia, there is a Santa Claus" newspaper column.

By March 1936 the pace of the Thurbers' life began to tell on them, and they spent two months in Bermuda, relaxing, though Thurber continued to work. Returning to New York in May, they decided to make a change to a less frenetic lifestyle, and began planning a move to Connecticut. They rented a house in Litchfield for the winter of 1936–1937. By the turn of the year Thurber's eye was starting to lose vision; he had a cataract, and was warned by his ophthalmologist that he would have to have an operation. The Thurbers went to Europe that May, delaying the eye operation; they toured France, and then visited London, where the Storran Gallery was putting on a one-man show of Thurber's artwork. Enough of the art sold that the Thurbers were able to rent a flat and stay in London until August; while there James became good friends with the architect John Duncan Miller. Trips to Wales and Scotland were followed by a return to London in September, then to Holland, Paris, and down to the Riviera in November to escape the Parisian winter. In early 1938 they drove to London, via Paris, and stayed in Piccadilly. Thurber was a celebrity in London; Hamish Hamilton were planning a collection of his work, to be called Cream of Thurber, and he was popular socially. They were enjoying London, but rumors of war were growing, and in August they left for the US.

=== Return from Europe ===
The Thurbers arrived in New York in September 1938. They rented a house in Woodbury, Connecticut, and Thurber spent some time with his daughter Rosemary, whom he had not seen in over a year. Thurber's vision had deteriorated further while he was in Europe; he was still driving during the daytime, but on one trip with Helen had to stop and change drivers when he could not see well enough to continue. He was busy, contributing art to books by several friends and connections, and thinking about a play he wanted to write. He began a series of fables for The New Yorker and a series of illustrations for famous poems such as "Barbara Frietchie" by John Greenleaf Whittier, and Henry Wadworth Longfellow's "Excelsior". In the winter of 1938–1939 he wrote "The Secret Life of Walter Mitty"; the story was published in the March 18, 1939 issue of The New Yorker, and was an immediate success. In early 1939 Elliott Nugent, his old college friend, who was now a well-known figure in Hollywood, became interested in Thurber's play outline, and Thurber decided to move to California and try a collaboration. They went by boat, via the Panama Canal, and the brilliant sun made Thurber's vision problems worse; by the time they arrived he was unable to read at all.

=== The Male Animal ===
After a couple of weeks Thurber's vision settled down and he was able to read and type. The Thurbers stayed in California for four months, by the end of which the play, titled The Male Animal, was more or less completed. The play's theme was academic freedom, with the central device the question of whether a professor at a Midwestern University was being allowed to read a letter from the anarchist Bartolomeo Vanzetti to his English composition class. Nugent arranged for tryouts and then rehearsals in California, while the Thurbers returned east by train, with James planning to bring in some much-needed income by returning to his usual writing and drawing. Shortly after returning to New York he had a complete book sketched out: a parable about a future World War, told in the format of a picture book. He showed it to Harper, who had been planning to publish a collection of his fables in time for Christmas, and they agreed to replace Fables For Our Time with the new book, titled The Last Flower. He returned to California for The Male Animal's opening night in San Diego on October 16, 1939; it was well-received for the two nights it ran, and Thurber and Nugent worked on changes over the following week, until it opened in Los Angeles. It closed after a week, and its future was uncertain. Meanwhile, in November, The Last Flower appeared, to very positive reviews.

Nugent came to New York and he and Thurber completely revised the play, and persuaded Herman Shumlin to produce and direct it. It opened in New York on January 9, 1940, with Ruth Matteson, Matt Briggs, and Gene Tierney in the leading roles. The show was a hit; it stayed in New York until mid-year, then moved to Chicago, and finally went on the road until early 1941. The money from royalties and film rights meant that the Thurbers no longer had any financial worries, but they both had health issues: Helen had anemia, and James had another incident with his eyesight.

=== Eye operations and depression ===
A cataract operation, in June 1940, improved Thurber's sight for a while, and he started a series of columns for PM, a New York newspaper, that ran from September 1940 to July 1941. Another operation in October 1940 was necessary, for glaucoma and iritis, but it was unsuccessful; Thurber was in hospital for a month, still in pain and with very little vision. Three more operations followed in the next six months, but by May 1941 he was legally blind—he now had to write longhand with plenty of space between the words, as he could not read what he had just written; Helen typed up these drafts for him. They moved to a house on Martha's Vineyard for the summer. Two stories he wrote for The New Yorker in this period are among his darkest: in "The Whip-Poor-Will" the protagonist goes mad and murders his wife and servants before killing himself. "The Cane in the Corridor" is a story inspired by a friend's refusal to visit Thurber in hospital; the story's hero attempts to take revenge for a friend's failure to visit him. At the same time he worked on a children's book titled Many Moons; it would not be illustrated by Thurber, because of his vision problems.

Once Many Moons was done Thurber's mental state deteriorated dramatically. He insisted they move in with friends of theirs on Martha's Vineyard, saying he needed to be around other people, but it did not help: he was depressed, drinking too much, antisocial, and worried about his health. He "went into a tailspin, crashed, and burst into flames" for four weeks, as he put it in a late August letter to his surgeon. By that time he was improving, thanks to Ruth Fox, a local doctor who specialized in alcoholism and treated him with shots of vitamin B1. While recuperating, Thurber met Mark Van Doren, and they become lifelong friends. The Thurbers left Martha's Vineyard in September, and left the manuscript of Many Moons behind; it was found the following year and published in 1943.

The Thurbers decided to stay in New York while James continued his recovery. He met with a psychiatrist who quickly decided that he needed no treatment, which calmed his fears that he was falling into clinical insanity. He started to write again, via dictation, and sent caption ideas to Ross for consideration; and he managed a few rough drawings, which the New Yorker's art staff inked in. Over the winter of 1941–1942 he had an affair with a secretary, but as he could not drive he had to rely on the New Yorker office boy to chauffeur him; this was the young Truman Capote, then eighteen years old. (Note: Thurber's vision was too weak for him to dress himself, so Capote had to dress him after each assignation. Once he got Thurber's socks on inside out, and Helen noticed the change that evening, and "asked him a lot of questions", as Capote later put it.) In March 1942 the film version of The Male Animal premiered in Columbus, and Thurber spent several days at the festivities as a hometown celebrity. The film, which starred Henry Fonda and Olivia de Havilland, was a great success.

=== 1942–1945: Blindness and more commercial success ===
Back in New York he was advised by Dr. Fox to move out of the city, and the Thurbers rented a house in Cornwall, Connecticut, near the Van Dorens. While in Cornwall Thurber wrote "The Catbird Seat", one of his best-known stories, and the positive reception it received helped restore his confidence. That October My World—And Welcome to It was published; this was a collection of his recent pieces, and it too was a success. He and Helen had hoped to stay in Cornwall over the winter of 1942–1943, but the fuel oil they needed to heat the house was unavailable because of wartime rationing, so they returned to New York in January. With the aid of a Zeiss loupe, a helmet-mounted magnifying device, he began to draw again on large paper in bright light; he was limited to ten minutes a day because of the strain on his eyes, but it enabled him to produce more drawings. They spent the summer of 1943 in Cornwall again, and two more Thurber books were published that year: Many Moons finally appeared, followed by Men, Women and Dogs, a collection of drawings which included many of his most famous cartoons and a series of drawings chronicling "The War Between Men and Women". It quickly sold out and went into a second printing. The following year he published another children's book, The Great Quillow, in which Quillow, a village toymaker, defeats a giant named Hunder. Hunder was a straightforward allegory for Adolf Hitler, and Quillow, as drawn by the book's illustrator, Doris Lee, looked rather like Thurber. That year they summered near Geneva, New York, instead of Cornwall, and Thurber became seriously ill with pneumonia there, recovering after getting sulfa drugs from a nearby Naval Training Station. He relapsed after he returned to New York, and was hospitalized for three weeks. In November, after he had recovered, they went to Hot Springs in Virginia for a vacation, and he had to be hospitalized again, this time for peritonitis caused by a ruptured appendix. By mid-December 1944 he was well enough to return to New York, where he gradually regained his health.

The Thurber Carnival, an anthology of Thurber's work that included a handful of uncollected pieces such as "The Catbird Seat", appeared in early 1945 to rapturous reviews. It was a Book-of-the-Month selection for February, which meant a print run of 375,000 copies beyond the publisher's initial run of 50,000. He was still able to draw, and produced a series of drawings for The New Yorker that pretended to illustrate phrases, such as "A Hopeless Quandary"—a horse, weeping, on a hill under a lonely star. Another fairy tale, The White Deer, was published that year: it was full of wordplay and literary allusions, and Thurber did not see it as a book for young children, commenting later that no child was likely to understand all the references in it.

=== Postwar years in Cornwall, Connecticut ===
The money from The Thurber Carnival enabled the Thurbers to buy a house in Cornwall, not far from their rental, which they referred to as "The Great Good Place". Thurber became part of a small group of artists and writers who lived or summered there, including Van Doren, Armin Landeck, and Marc Simont. Thurber had long been prone to unpleasant behaviour at night, when drinking, and Cornwall was no exception: he goaded and needled almost all his acquaintances there, most of whom put up with him "only because he was blind and famous", as one of them later said. He also had affairs; when one became serious enough for the woman to boast to Helen that she could have James whenever she wanted, Helen replied, "What will you do with him? He's blind, clumsy, and he needs constant help."

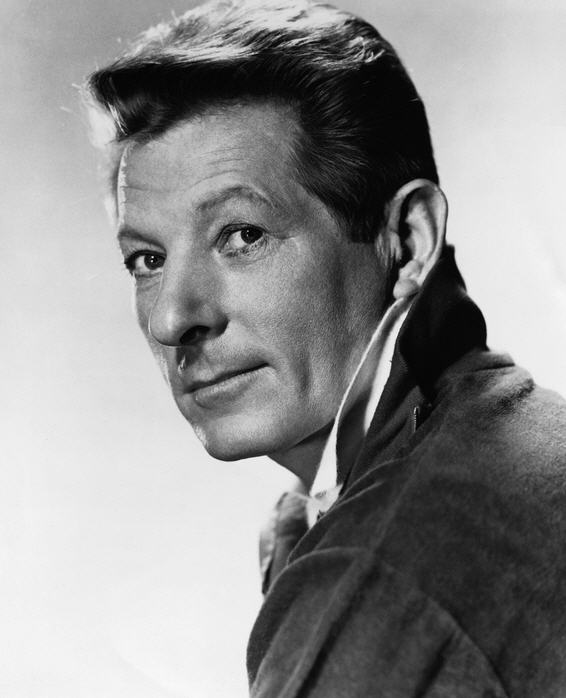
Danny Kaye

In 1944 Thurber had sold the film rights for "The Secret Life of Walter Mitty" to Samuel Goldwyn. The script was developed without Thurber's involvement, and with Danny Kaye as the proposed lead. Thurber reviewed the script at the end of 1945, and was dismayed; he suggested numerous changes, but few of them were adopted. The film appeared in August 1947, and both Goldwyn and Thurber wrote letters to Life magazine giving their opposing opinions of the result. Goldwyn also owned the rights to "The Catbird Seat", but Thurber was able to recover them; a film was eventually made of the story in the UK in 1959, titled The Battle of the Sexes and starring Peter Sellers.

Thurber was productive in the late 1940s, despite his vision handicaps, but his drawing days were over: his last original cartoon for The New Yorker appeared in 1947. (Note: In 1948 Ross arranged for Frank Modell, one of the New Yorker cartoonists, to snip up elements of Thurber's old cartoons, and reassemble them into new cartoons for which Thurber provided the captions. This continued for years, but eventually stopped when the "slightly shady practice" became known to the public.) He wrote a series of five articles about radio soap operas for The New Yorker and his humorous pieces continued to appear there as well, along with the occasional short story. The Beast in Me, a collection of his short pieces and cartoons, appeared in late 1948; it did not sell nearly as well as The Thurber Carnival. In 1950 Helen was hospitalized for a hysterectomy, and soon afterwards she and James went to Bermuda to relax and recover. While in Bermuda he wrote another fairy tale, The 13 Clocks. It was illustrated by Simont, appeared in November 1950, and was adapted for television in 1953.

== Later life ==
During the anti-Communist McCarthy years, in the 1950s, Thurber was never subpoenaed by Congress or harassed for his occasionally liberal views. (Note: Helen was told that "a congressman once said James was never interrogated because 'our wives and children wouldn't allow it'".) He was and had always been opposed to communism, but was outraged by the treatment of his fellow writers. That year Thurber's alma mater, Ohio State University, offered him a Doctorate of Letters, to be conferred at the December ceremonies. Ohio State, concerned about the rising tide of McCarthyism, instituted a requirement in September 1951 requiring scrutiny of any speaker, and the speech itself, by the university. Thurber was offended by what he considered an attack on free speech, and declined the honorary degree. In 1952 his and Nugent's play, The Male Animal, was revived on Broadway for a two-week run. Reviews commented on the obvious parallels to and commentary on McCarthyism, and the play went on a successful national tour.

The Thurbers spent early 1952 in Bermuda, and did not return to New York for the premiere—Thurber was depressed, irritable, and unable to work. He suffered from persistent headaches, and was unable to tolerate alcohol, but despite giving up both drink and cigarettes his temper worsened. His friend Miller visited him in Bermuda and recalled his worst spells as those of "a storming, raging, vituperative madman". At one point he attacked Helen so violently that she briefly walked out on him. Eventually his condition was diagnosed as a thyroid problem, and his doctors began trying drug treatments. It took a year or two before he was emotionally back on an even keel, and his letters of 1952 and 1953 are full of irascibility and complaints.

The Thurbers spent six months of 1955 in Europe, arriving in Paris, in May, before going on to London, where James gave multiple interviews, and wrote one humorous piece, about the Loch Ness Monster. They returned in October. Thurber's Dogs was published at about the time they returned; this was an anthology drawn from the many cartoons and pieces Thurber had written about dogs. At the end of 1955 Thurber decided to continue the series of fables he had written fifteen years earlier, though this time most of them were overtly political. The New Yorker bought thirty-seven of them as he wrote them over the course of 1956, and they were collected, along with ten that The New Yorker had turned down, at the end of the year under the title Further Fables For Our Time. Thurber was angry with The New Yorker over the rejection of ten of the fables. This was partly because he was convinced they were rejected for political reasons (though this seems not to have been the case), and partly because of the death of the magazine's fiction editor, Gus Lobrano, in early 1956. Lobrano had handled Thurber with tact, but William Maxwell, his replacement, simply rejected material he did not want, or rewrote it without involving Thurber. The New Yorker also rejected his fairytale The Wonderful O, which appeared in book form in 1957, after Maxwell was unable to agree with Thurber on cuts that he wanted, and Thurber's relationship with the magazine, and his letters to them, became more and more ill-tempered. Thurber's dark mood became darker when in mid-1957 his old friend John McNulty died; and when The New Yorker made editorial changes to the obituary Thurber wrote, Thurber was infuriated again.

His rancor towards The New Yorker was accompanied over the next year by a return to his earlier pattern of staying out late, drinking, and unpleasant and hostile behavior to his friends and acquaintances. Helen described James in his last years as "... paranoid, feuding with the people he loved most. He was in terrible despair ...", and his old friend Ann Honeycutt described him as "one hell of a bore ... He was so nasty and repetitious in his stories". He was still writing: the main project of these years was a series of articles about Harold Ross, who had died in 1951. These appeared in The Atlantic from November 1957 to August 1958, and were expanded and published in book form as The Years With Ross in March 1959. It was a bestseller, and received generally good reviews. Critical comments about the book from White upset Thurber, deepening a rift between them.

=== Last years ===
In mid-1958 the Thurbers visited France and the UK again, staying for five months. In London Thurber was invited to Punch magazine's table (a high honor, awarded previously only to one American, Mark Twain), and was a sought-after guest at a party given by Larry Adler. In Paris he met with Adlai Stevenson. Thurber was delighted by these attentions, and Miller recalled that Thurber and Stevenson "were instantly entranced by each other's eloquence ... It was the best evening I ever spent with Jim", though Miller added that during this trip "Jim was very bad and getting worse ... The pattern was ranting, raving, and then apology."

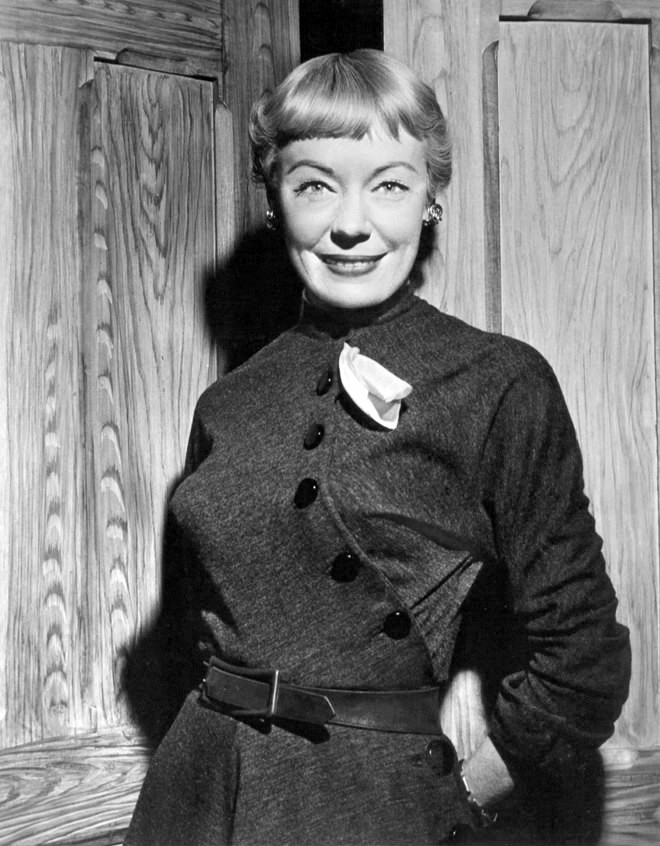
Haila Stoddard in 1954

Haila Stoddard, then a television actress, approached Thurber in 1959 to suggest a dramatization of some of her favorite works of his. This developed into a revue titled A Thurber Carnival, with Thurber working on the script. It opened on Broadway in New York at the end of February. The reviews were positive and the show ran for seventeen weeks before being killed by a writers' strike. It reopened in New York later in the year, but sales were poor: at Stoddard's suggestion, Thurber joined the cast for three months, playing himself, and ticket sales promptly recovered. The acting and the success of the show improved his mental state; according to Stoddard "he was suddenly a happy man again", and he recognized the benefits, later telling Roger Angell that he joined the cast to resolve "grave psychosomatic problems ... to restore a very shaky balance".

The show closed at the end of November 1960, and Thurber returned to Cornwall. It was probably at this time that he had the first of several small strokes that afflicted him during his final year. Whether or not that was the cause, his mood and behavior changed for the worse again very quickly. He became violent, drinking more, smashing glasses, and scaring Helen to the point that she sometimes asked a neighbor to spend the night at the Thurbers' house. He had become interested in extrasensory perception (ESP), and in an argument about it with Mark Van Doren became so abusive that it ended their friendship of almost two decades.

In January he sailed to England to work on a possible production of A Thurber Carnival, but the plans came to nothing. His mental state deteriorated further. Helen described his behavior as paranoid; he would "sit up talking to himself all night, raving on and on". The Gudes, two of James's closest friends from his earliest days at The New Yorker, were traveling in France, but came to London when James wired them begging for help. They found him drinking heavily and abusing Helen verbally, but managed to get him on a boat back to the US in May.

Lanterns and Lances, a collection of previously unpublished pieces, appeared in April, and he continued to submit material to The New Yorker, though much of what he sent was rejected. His last piece for the magazine appeared in the August 19, 1961 issue. He also worked on a book to be titled Autobiography of a Mind, which he intended to cover his own mental state and powers, as well as ESP, ghosts, and some material about Harry Houdini. He continued his verbal ill-treatment of Helen, and by mid-1961 his friends were trying to persuade him to see a psychiatrist, but he refused. Aware that something was wrong, he gave up alcohol and cigarettes in August, but soon started drinking again. Suggestions that he see a neurologist were met with furious outbursts. At the end of August, Jap Gude took him to New York, at James's request; James wanted to get away from Helen. Gude, almost the only friend Thurber had not driven away by this time, took care of him at the Algonquin Hotel for a week, coping with his increasingly irrational and abusive behavior.

In the early morning of October 4, 1961, Thurber collapsed and hit his head. He was taken to Doctors Hospital and underwent emergency surgery to remove a haematoma; the operation revealed evidence of earlier strokes, and of arteriosclerosis. He was occasionally conscious after the surgery, but died on November 2. His ashes were buried in Green Lawn Cemetery in Columbus, near to his parents' headstones.

== Legacy and honors ==
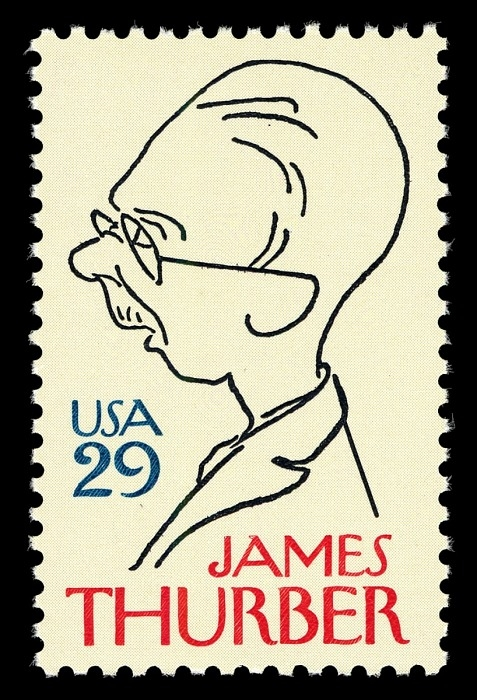
Commemorative stamp issued by the US in 1994

Thurber received three honorary doctorates of letters during his lifetime: from Kenyon College in 1950, Williams College in 1951, and Yale in 1953. Also in 1953 he was given a special career award by the Ohioana Library Association. The speech he wrote for the presentation, an attack on McCarthyism, was published separately as Thurber on Humor the following year. His fairy tale The White Deer won the Ohioana Book Award for 1946, and two of Thurber's books were finalists for the National Book Award: Further Fables for Our Time, in 1957, and The Years with Ross, in 1960. Further Fables for Our Time also won the American Library Association's Liberty and Justice Award. In 1960 Thurber received a special Tony Award for A Thurber Carnival.

A commemorative stamp was issued in Thurber's honor by the US Postal Service in 1994. In 1995 Thurber was posthumously awarded a degree by Ohio State University. Two of his residences have been listed on the U.S. National Register of Historic Places: his childhood Thurber House in Ohio and the Sanford–Curtis–Thurber House in Fairfield County, Connecticut. The Thurber Prize, an annual award for humorous writing, was established in 1997; in 2024 an additional award for cartoon artists was added. Past winners include The Onion, Jon Stewart and the writers of The Daily Show, Calvin Trillin, and Trevor Noah.

== See also ==
- Walter Mitty, expression
- List of works by James Thurber

== Sources ==
- Bernstein, Burton (1975). Thurber: A Biography. New York: Arbor House. ISBN 0-87795-690-1.
- Holmes, Charles S. (1972). The Clocks of Columbus: The Literary Career of James Thurber. New York: Atheneum.
- Kinney, Harrison (1995). James Thurber: His Life and Times. New York: Henry Holt & Company. ISBN 0-8050-3966-X.
- Yagoda, Ben (2000). About Town: The New Yorker and the World It Made. New York: Scribner. ISBN 0-684-81605-9.
