= My Life and Hard Times =

1933 book by James Thurber

- First edition
- Author: James Thurber
- Language: English
- Genre: Autobiography
- Publisher: Harper & Brothers
- Publication date: 1933
- ISBN: 978-0-060-93308-1

My Life and Hard Times is the 1933 autobiography of James Thurber. It is considered his greatest work as he relates in bewildered deadpan prose the eccentric goings on of his family and the town beyond (Columbus, Ohio).

Characters include the maid who lives in constant fear of being hypnotised; a grandfather who believes that the American Civil War is still going on; a mother who fears electricity is leaking all over the house and Muggs, "The Dog That Bit People", an Airedale Terrier that had a penchant for biting certain people, including the author.

The book was a best seller and also achieved high critical praise. Russell Baker writing in the New York Times said it was "possibly the shortest and most elegant autobiography ever". Ogden Nash said it was "just about the best thing I ever read"', and Dorothy Parker said "Mad, I don't say. Genius I grant you."
