= Honner =

Honner may refer to:

- Honner Township, Redwood County, Minnesota, United States
- John St. George Honner, an American farmer and politician
- Maria Honner, an Irish actress
- Ralph Honner, an Australian soldier
- Robert William Honner, an English actor
