= Hardwick Court Farm =

Farm with farmhouse in Surrey, England

Coordinates: 51.385°N 0.532°W

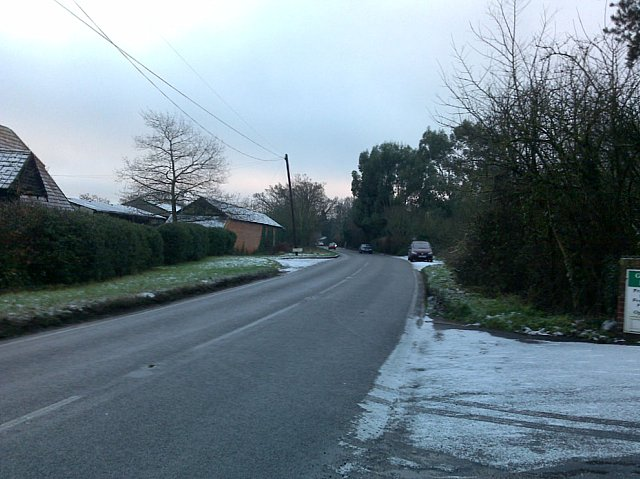
Hardwick Lane — Hardwick Court Farm is on the left

Hardwick Court Farm, Hardwick Court when a manor, is a large farm with farmhouse in the west of Chertsey, Surrey, England and was first established during the Saxon period. A Saxon main road to Chertsey once ran through it but is now reduced to just a farm track.

== History ==
Court in the name refers to the Court of the Manor and Hundred Courts were held in the tithe barn which was built in the mid-15th century for Chertsey Abbey, who then owned the farm, to store tithes a form of taxes in kind. This court was for minor offences or to settle arguments. Tithings across Chertsey had several evolved names, this one was formerly Lolworth and Rookbury and earliest seen as Hardwitch before settling on Hardwick. A first reference to it Hardwick, a manor, occurs in 1430 when it was held by the abbey and assigned to William Frowyk to farm. As an Abbot's asset, the farming tenant was in early years only in receipt of half of the waifs and strays in the land of the manor.

Its land at the time of the abbey's dissolution the underlying title was taken by The Crown, and then or shortly after, was in the tenure of William Cooke, afterwards leased with the manor to Sir William Fitz William in 1550 and afterwards to his widow Joan, who died in 1574; afterwards leased, in 1589, to Richard Lilley, this time without the manor. Perhaps with this family, at the start of the English Civil War the farm was held by the Royalists who lost the war. The victorious Parliamentarians captured the farm and kept a document listing all of the land owned by Parliament. Hardwick Court was confiscated and awarded to Robert Boscoes or Bowes, thereafter including the farm and manor of Hardwick. After the war and temporary government (what was termed 'the Commonwealth') on the Restoration of the Monarchy, the farm was returned to the royal family and was one of many possessions in Surrey and elsewhere presented from King Charles II to his wife.

The farm remained in royal family overall ownership until the Georgian period, when it was sold.

=== Modern History ===
During World War II the farm was hit by three Luftwaffe bombs in 1940. One landed on the East side of Cockcrow Hill, leaving a crater that was not filled-in until late 2019. Another hit one end of the farmhouse and destroyed the kitchen, part of the dining room, a bedroom and part of the attic. The house survived and but was not rebuilt in its original form and size. A third bomb damaged the South end of the tithe barn which was later repaired.

In 1963 the farm came up for sale and was bought by veterinarian Dr Carl Boyde. The farm was divided up and a portion of the farm had an impressive miniature railway built on it called 'the Great Cockcrow Railway', which opened in 1968 and survives to this day. A leading local historian, the late Bernard Pardoe, researched the history of the farm in detail (and apparently published his findings circa 1964) and journalist Howard Johnson also featured the history of the farm in an unidentified local newspaper in the 1980s.

A fire broke out at the south end in 1978 but the damage was repaired and this example of medieval building remains in agricultural use today.

During the 1970s the farm was reduced in size, similarly to its earlier loss on land on earlier sales, when the M25 motorway was routed through two of its fields and separated the farm from Chertsey, though a tunnel bridge exists to the southeast of the farm allowing the A320 (Note: From this tunnel, 100m south is the mini-roundabout to Holloway and Hardwick Lane running past the farm, which lies at 21m AOD compared to the town centre's 14m AOD) to access Chertsey.

In 2007 the farm was at the front line in the fight against foot and mouth disease as it was only three hundred yards away from where hundreds of cattle had to be killed.

== Architecture ==
While the farmhouse has been rebuilt several times, the barn is a rare survivor of its kind, was listed in 1952 and was dated in 2009 by the University of London using dendrochronology to 1445.

Hardwick Court farmhouse dates to the 16th century (Tudor period) with substantial other parts 17th century, with two great gables, three chimneys, made of red brick. Mullion transom (architecture) windows form some of the windows and the right hand portion of the house damaged by enemy action and was rebuilt on rather different lines from the original.

== Neighbouring site ==
Miniature railway, Great Cockcrow Railway is adjoining the farm.

== Notes and references ==
Notes
