= Shirley Brooks =

English journalist and novelist

Charles William Shirley Brooks
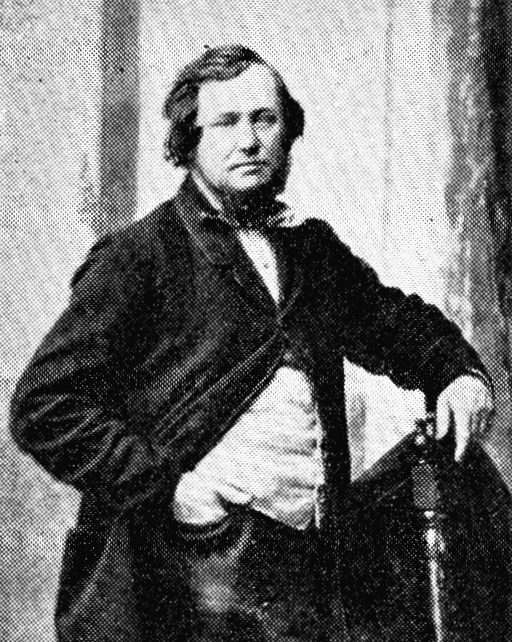
- From The History of "Punch" (1895)
- Born: 29 April 1816; London, England
- Died: 23 February 1874 (aged 57); London, England
- Occupations: journalist, novelist; editor of Punch

Charles William Shirley Brooks (29 April 1816 – 23 February 1874) was an English journalist and novelist. Born in London, he began his career in a solicitor's office. Shortly afterwards he took to writing, and contributed to various periodicals. In 1851 he joined the staff of Punch, to which he contributed "Essence of Parliament," and on the death of Mark Lemon in 1870 he succeeded him as editor. He published a few novels, including Aspen Court and The Gordian Knot.

== Life ==
Brooks was the son of William Brooks, architect, who died on 11 December 1867, aged 80, by his wife Elizabeth, the eldest daughter of William Sabine of Islington. He was born at 52 Doughty Street, London, 29 April 1816. After his earlier education he was articled, on 24 April 1832, to his uncle, Mr. Charles Sabine of Oswestry, for the term of five years, and passed the Incorporated Law Society's examination in November 1838, but there is no record of his ever having become a solicitor.

During five sessions he occupied a seat in the reporters' gallery of the House of Commons, as the writer of the parliamentary summary in the Morning Chronicle. In 1853 he was sent by that journal as special commissioner to inquire into the questions connected with the subject of labour and the poor in Russia, Syria, and Egypt. His letters from these countries were afterwards collected and published in the sixth volume of the Travellers' Library, under the title of the Russians of the South.

As of 1842, he signed his articles which were appearing in Ainsworth's Magazine as Charles W. Brooks. His second literary signature was C. Shirley Brooks, and finally he became Shirley Brooks. His full Christian names were Charles William Shirley, the last being an old name in the family. His first magazine papers, among which were A Lounge in the Œil de Bœuf, An Excursion of some English Actors to China, Cousin Emily, and The Shrift on the Rail, brought him into communication with Harrison Ainsworth, Laman Blanchard, and other well-known men, and he soon became the centre of a strong muster of literary friends, who found pleasure in his wit and social qualities. As a dramatist he frequently achieved considerable success, without, however, once making any ambitious effort—such, for example, as producing a five-act comedy. His original drama The Creole, or Love's Fetters, was produced at the Lyceum 8 April 1847 with marked applause. A lighter piece, entitled Anything for a Change, was brought out at the same house 7 June 1848. Two years afterwards, 5 Aug. 1850, his two-act drama, the Daughter of the Stars, was acted at the New Strand Theatre. The exhibition of 1851 gave occasion for his writing The Exposition: a Scandinavian Sketch, containing as much irrelevant matter as possible in one act, which was produced at the Strand on 28 April in that year.

In association with John Oxenford, he supplied to the Olympic, 26 Dec. 1861, an extravaganza entitled Timour the Tartar, or the Iron Master of Samarkand, the explanatory letterpress stating that a trifling lapse between the year 1361 and the year 1861 occasionally occurs. Amongst his other dramatic pieces are Guardian Angel, a farce, Lowther Arcade, Honours and Tricks, and Our New Governess.

Brooks was in his earlier days a contributor to many of the best periodicals. He was a leader writer on the Illustrated London News, to which journal at a later period he furnished a weekly article under the name of Nothing in the Papers. He conducted the Literary Gazette 1858–9, and edited Home News after the death of Robert Bell in 1867. To a volume edited by Albert Smith in 1849, called Gavarni in London, he furnished three sketches — The Opera, The Coulisse, and The Foreign Gentleman; and in companionship with Angus B. Reach he published A Story with a Vengeance in 1852. At thirty-eight years of age he began to assert his claim to consideration as a popular novelist by writing Aspen Court: a Story of our own Time. He then allowed five years to elapse before he made his second venture as a novelist. He did so as the author of a twelve-installment serial fiction, the Gordian Knot, from January 1858; but this work, illustrated by John Tenniel, remained unfinished for upwards of two years.

Brooks's important connection with Punch began in 1851. He made use of the name Epicurus Rotundus as the signature to his articles. For the rest of his life he was a contributor to the columns of the periodical, and in 1870 he succeeded Mark Lemon as editor. One of his best known series of articles was The Essence of Parliament, a style of writing for which he was peculiarly fitted by his previous training in connection with the Morning Chronicle.

On 14 March 1872 Brooks was elected a fellow of the Society of Antiquaries.

In January, 1874 he was a founder member of the Cremation Society of Great Britain, set up to campaign for the legalisation of cremation, but within a few weeks he had died.

Death found him in the midst of his books and papers working cheerfully amongst his family. Two articles, Election Epigrams and The Situation, were written on his death-bed, and before they were published he was dead. He died at 6 Kent Terrace, Regent's Park, London, on 23 February 1874, and was buried in Kensal Green Cemetery on the 28th.

He married Emily Margaret, daughter of Dr. William Walkinshaw of Naparima, Trinidad. She was granted a civil list pension of £100 on 19 June 1876, and died on 14 May 1880. Their son, Reginald Shirley Brooks, was also a journalist.

Brooks had a brother, Henry A. Brooks (c. 20 May 1826 – 25 May 1867), editor and part-proprietor of the Albury Banner and Wodonga Express, a newspaper in Albury, New South Wales.

== Works ==
The works by Brooks not already mentioned are:

- The Wigwam: a burletta, in one act (1847)
- Amusing Poetry (1857)
- The Silver Cord: a story (1861), 3 vols
- Follies of the Year (1866), by J. Leech, with notes by S. Brooks
- Sooner or Later (1866–8) with illustrations by George Du Maurier, 3 vols
- The Naggletons; and, Miss Violet and her Offers (1875)
- Wit and Humour, Poems from "Punch" (1875), edited by his son, Reginald Shirley Brooks
