= R1 class =

R1 class or Class R1 may refer to:

- R1-class Sydney tram
- LCDR R1 class, 0-4-4T steam locomotives
- NER Class R1, 4-4-0 steam locomotives
- Pennsylvania Railroad class R1, electric locomotive
