= Great Cockcrow Railway =

7 1/4 in (184 mm) gauge miniature railway located near Chertsey, Surrey, England

Coordinates: 51.3850°N 0.5231°W

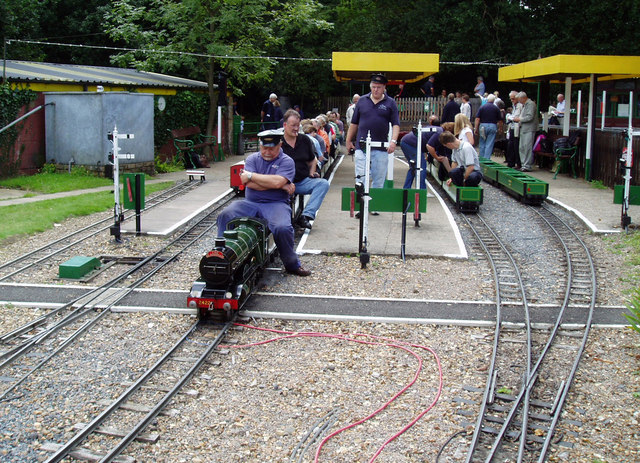
- Trains and visitors at the Great Cockcrow Railway station in 2004

Overview
- Locale: near Chertsey, Surrey, England
- Dates of operation: 1968–
- Predecessor: Greywood Central Railway

Technical
- Track gauge: 7 1/4 in (184 mm)

Other
- Website: www.cockcrow.co.uk

The Great Cockcrow Railway is a 7 1/4 in (184 mm) gauge miniature railway located near Chertsey, Surrey, England. It is usually open on Sunday afternoons from May to October inclusive.

== History ==
This 7 1/4 in (184 mm) gauge railway originated in 1946 when John Samuel started construction in the garden of his house, 'Greywood', on the Burwood Park estate at Walton-on-Thames. With the help of a group of volunteers the Greywood Central Railway developed until 1962, when a run of 0.75 miles (1.21 km) was possible. From the first the line was properly signalled and ultimately worked to a timetable. Samuel's death in October 1962 threw the railway's future into doubt but the publisher, Ian Allan purchased the line and, with the assistance of the GCR volunteers, moved it to its present site at Hardwick Lane, Chertsey. It reopened to the public on 14 September 1968 under the new name Great Cockcrow Railway, taken from Cockcrow Hill which rises on its south side.

The most recent innovation is a proper station building, completed in 2014 after several planning, financial and constructional delays. It houses a Tea Room and toilets, including disabled facilities, as well as the booking office and staff accommodation. The railway is open to the public on Sundays from the beginning of May to the end of October between 1:00 pm and 4:30 pm. A gala day with visiting engines is held in September, and on the last Saturday in October Halloween is celebrated with night-time operation.

== Stations ==
- Hardwick Central - the main terminus of the railway, where trains begin and finish their journeys. The railways sheds and station facilities are situated here, including Hardwick signal box, the ticket office and cafe.
- Everglades Junction - the main hub of the railway, from here Everglades signal box controls movements from Hardwick Central and Cockcrow Hill, routing trains as required.
- Jungle Halt - watch out for the residents of Jungle Halt, this is accessed by Red Route trains climbing The Spur.
- Green Lane - the railways furthest point, and where Green Route trains begin their journey back to Hardwick Central.
- Cockcrow Hill - originally the end of the line for "Branch" trains, this terminus was bypassed by the Millennium Line in the year 2000 and now trains have two different routes available to them. Red route trains still terminate at Cockcrow Hill where passengers can see the loco run round its train. Green Route trains bypass the terminus and circumnavigate the Millennium Line to send them back to Hardwick Central via Everglades Junction.

== Signalling ==
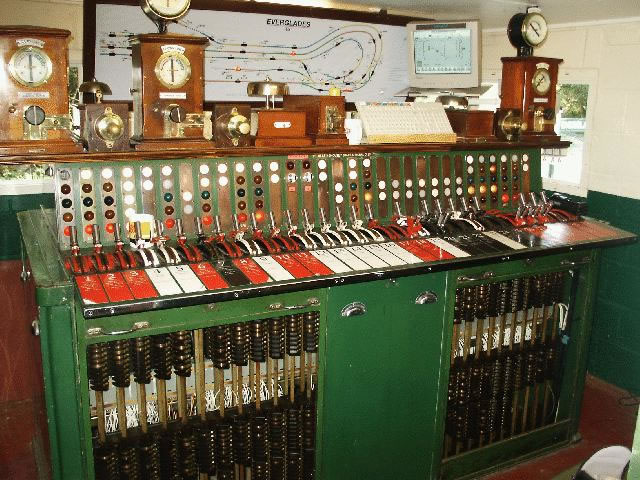
A view of the interior of Everglades Junction Signalbox showing the Lever frame

Prototypical working with full track circuiting and accurate signalling remains the key to the railway's operation. The two termini are controlled by semaphores while the whole of the main line is equipped with colour-lights, ten of these being automatic. The boxes at Hardwick Central and Everglades Junction are fitted with Westinghouse 'L' type frames with, respectively, twenty-three and thirty-one miniature levers. The former was once part of the 227-lever installation at Crewe South junction while the latter is the complete frame from South Croydon Junction. The country terminus, Cockcrow Hill, has a 16-lever full-size 'knee' frame manufactured by the Railway Signal Company, probably around 1930. It came from the Waterloo terminus of the Waterloo & City line.

As in full-size practice, trains are offered and accepted between signal boxes by the use of Block instruments. Hardwick is configured as a Midland box, Everglades is configured as a Southern box. Because of the complication of the area it controls, and there may be as many as six trains on the track diagram at once, Everglades Junction box is also equipped with a train describer to assist the signalmen, usually two on duty together, in keeping track of movements. The train describer is also of great use in logging locomotive activity over the course of a season, and calculating average route miles.

The signalling system is all-electric, including the interlocking, semaphores being worked by solenoids sealed for outdoor use. All signals are weighted to return to 'danger' when the train has passed into the next track-circuit section. Points have a mechanism powered by the very reliable Ford Escort windscreen wiper motor that moves the blades and then locks and detects them, no detection means no signal! The few sprung points in the facing direction are also electrically detected with micro-switches to ensure closure after a train has passed through in the trailing direction.

== Trains ==
Rolling stock consists of 28 four-seater 'sit-in' carriages plus four further coaches that are articulated into twins. All passenger carriages and locomotives are fitted with vacuum brakes. Trains hauled by the smaller engines are generally made up of three carriages to accommodate 12 passengers; the more powerful locos can haul four carriages, carrying up to 16 passengers. The all-up weight of a three-car train - without the engine - is estimated on average to be about 1 1/4 tons or 1,270 kg. A varied collection of freight and engineering stock may also be seen.

== Locomotives ==
Anywhere from seven to ten can usually be seen on operating days, with several other types resting, being constructed, or under repairs by members.

Most of the steam locomotives are based on British mainline prototypes built to 1/8 scale. All four pre-Nationalisation companies are represented and locos from both pre-Grouping and BR 'Standard' eras are present, as well as some freelance types. The oldest, a North Eastern Railway class 'R1' (LNER D19) 4-4-0 was built in 1913 and is still in working order. The smallest is an SR S14 while the largest are the 4-6-2 'Pacifics', the oldest being a freelance version built by Louis Shaw in 1927 and given the name 'Eureka' by Sir John Samuel in 1947 as he had found, in his opinion, the ideal engine for his railway. Other Pacifics represent prototypes from the LMS, LNER and Southern companies, as well as British Railways. Engines of 2-6-0 and 4-6-0 wheel arrangement feature as do 'Atlantics' from both the GNR and LBSCR alongside 0-8-0, 2-8-0 and 2-10-0 goods engines.

As of 2016, the railway owner the following locomotives:

Steam Locos
No.	Name	Class	Company	Year built	Wheel Configuration	Livery/Colour
-	Wensleydale		N/A	2012	0-6-0ST	GER Blue
1	Lulubelle	US Switcher	N/A	1978	0-4-0	Lined mid-green
10		Hawthorn Leslie	N/A	1987	0-6-0ST	Buttercup yellow
117		T9	SR	2013	4-4-0	SR unlined black
206		K5	LNER	1956	2-6-0	Wartime unlined black
517		H16	SR	2015	4-6-2T	Lined Maunsell green
730		T9	SR	2013	4-4-0	Lined Maunsell green
837		S15	SR	1947	4-6-0	Olive green
1229		NER R1	LNER	1913	4-4-0	NER pea green
1249		NER T2	LNER	1986	0-8-0	NER lined black
1442		GNR C1	LNER	1988	4-4-2	GNR grass green
1803		U	SR	1980	2-6-0	Olive green
1935		K3	LNER	1974	2-6-0	Lined apple green
1947	Eureka	Freelance GCR	LNER	1927	4-6-2	Unlined Brunswick green
2422	North Foreland	H2	SR	1981	4-4-2	Lined Maunsell green
2744	Grand Parade	A1/A3	LNER	1990	4-6-2	Apple green
5000	Sister Dora	LMS 5MT	LMS	1989	4-6-0	Lined black
5241		LMS 5MT	LMS		4-6-0	Unlined black
6115	Scots Guardsman	LMS 6P	LMS	1990	4-6-0	Lined red
8374		LMS 8F	LMS	1993	2-8-0	Unlined black
21C11	General Steam Navigation	Merchant Navy	SR	1993	4-6-2	SR malachite green
30285		T9	SR	2013	4-4-0	BR lined black
30541		Q	SR	2000	0-6-0	BR unlined black
30850	Lord Nelson	Lord Nelson	SR	1985	4-6-0	Lined Brunswick green
45145		LMS 5MT	LMS	1991	4-6-0	BR
45157	Gordon Highlander	LMS 5MT	LMS	1996	4-6-0	BR lined black
45440		LMS 5MT	LMS	2004	4-6-0	BR lined black
46245	City of London	LMS 8P	LMS	1950	4-6-2	BR lined red
70054	Dornoch Firth	BR 7MT	BR	2015	4-6-2	BR lined Brunswick green
73755		WD	BR	1953	2-10-0	WD grey

== Bibliography ==
- Clarke, Jeremy (2016). Great Cockcrow Railway. Ian Allan. ISBN 978-0-7110-3862-2.
