= Reginald Brooks =

Reginald Brooks may refer to:

- Dallas Brooks (Reginald Alexander Dallas Brooks, 1896–1966), British military commander, cricketer and Governor of Victoria, Australia
- Reginald Shirley Brooks (1854–1888), English journalist
