= Angus Reach =

Angus Bethune Reach
- Born: 23 January 1821; Inverness, Scotland
- Died: 25 November 1856 (aged 35); Camberwell Green, England
- Education: Inverness Royal Academy, Edinburgh University
- Years active: 1841–1855
- Notable credit(s): Morning Chronicle, Punch, Illustrated London News

Angus Bethune Reach (23 January 1821 – 15 November 1856) was a 19th-century British writer, noted for both his journalism and fiction. He was an acquaintance of such contemporary novelists as William Makepeace Thackeray and Edmund Yates, and counted the journalist and novelist Shirley Brooks as his greatest friend.

== Journalistic career ==
Reach was born in Inverness, Scotland, to solicitor Roderick Reach and his wife Ann. He attended school at Inverness Royal Academy, beginning early in life to contribute a series of articles to the local Inverness Courier. Following a short period of study at Edinburgh University he moved in 1841 to London, where he gained a job as a court reporter for the Morning Chronicle newspaper. Reach's early duties included coverage of events at the Old Bailey and later the House of Commons, before he gained greater recognition contributing to an investigative journalism series on the conditions of the urban poor in the manufacturing districts of England. He subsequently became the Chronicle's arts critic, a post he held for over ten years.

In addition to his work for the Chronicle, Reach wrote the gossip column Town and Table Talk for the Illustrated London News and corresponded from London for the Inverness Courier. He later joined the staff of the celebrated satirical journal Punch, having contributed previously to two of its rivals, The Man in the Moon and The Puppet Show. He developed a reputation as a humourist, including for his satires The Comic Bradshaw and The Natural History of Humbugs.

== Other works ==
Reach's novel, originally serialised as Clement Lorimer, or, The Book with the Iron Clasps, ran in monthly instalments through 1848–9, before being collected in a single volume and later republished in two parts as Leonard Lindsay, or, The Story of a Buccaneer. The work, a crime thriller set in the world of horseracing, has been described as a "template for the pulp tradition." He also published works of travel writing, including Claret and Olives, an account of a tour of France originally serialised in the Chronicle.

== Personal life ==
Reach was married and was survived by his wife.

Reach figured in the anecdotes of a number of his literary friends. One concerned his profound colourblindness, a condition of which Reach was apparently unaware until adulthood. Purportedly, while dining with a friend – the ophthalmologist Jabez Hogg – Reach asked a waiter to bring him ink to complete a letter to the Chronicle. The ink was brought in a wineglass and a distracted Reach, unable to distinguish it by colour from his glass of claret, had to be stopped by his friend from drinking the ink. Another tale, told by Thackeray, concerned the pronunciation of his name. On their first meeting, Thackeray reportedly pronounced Reach's name to rhyme with "beach", and the latter informed him that the correct rendering was disyllabic: "REE-ack". Thackeray apologised for his mistake but later, when offering Reach dessert from a bowl of peaches, asked him "Mr Re-ak, will you take a pe-ak?"

== Illness and death ==
In 1854 Reach suffered an attack described variously in contemporary accounts as a "paralytic" illness and a "softening of the brain", and identified by modern biographers as a probable cerebral haemorrhage. The attack left Reach unable to work and to provide for his wife: his friends, led by the author Albert Richard Smith, organised a benefit performance at the Olympia Theatre in London to raise funds to support Reach's family during his incapacitation. The performance included many of the works Reach himself had written or translated: all the seats in the house sold out, and such figures as Charles Dickens numbered among the audience. A repeat performance, at the Drury Lane Theatre, was attended by Queen Victoria and Prince Albert. For another year Shirley Brooks fulfilled Reach's obligations to the Chronicle, writing his columns and paying the proceeds to Reach's wife, but Reach was never to recover and died in November 1856.

Contemporary commentators attributed Reach's illness to overwork, including as a result of the frequent changes of ownership experienced by the Chronicle. Later biographers have suggested that alcohol consumption is likely to have contributed to his declining health.

Reach was buried in Norwood. Following his death his friend Thackeray contributed to the erection of a monument in his memory.
