= The Sporting Times =

British newspaper devoted chiefly to sport

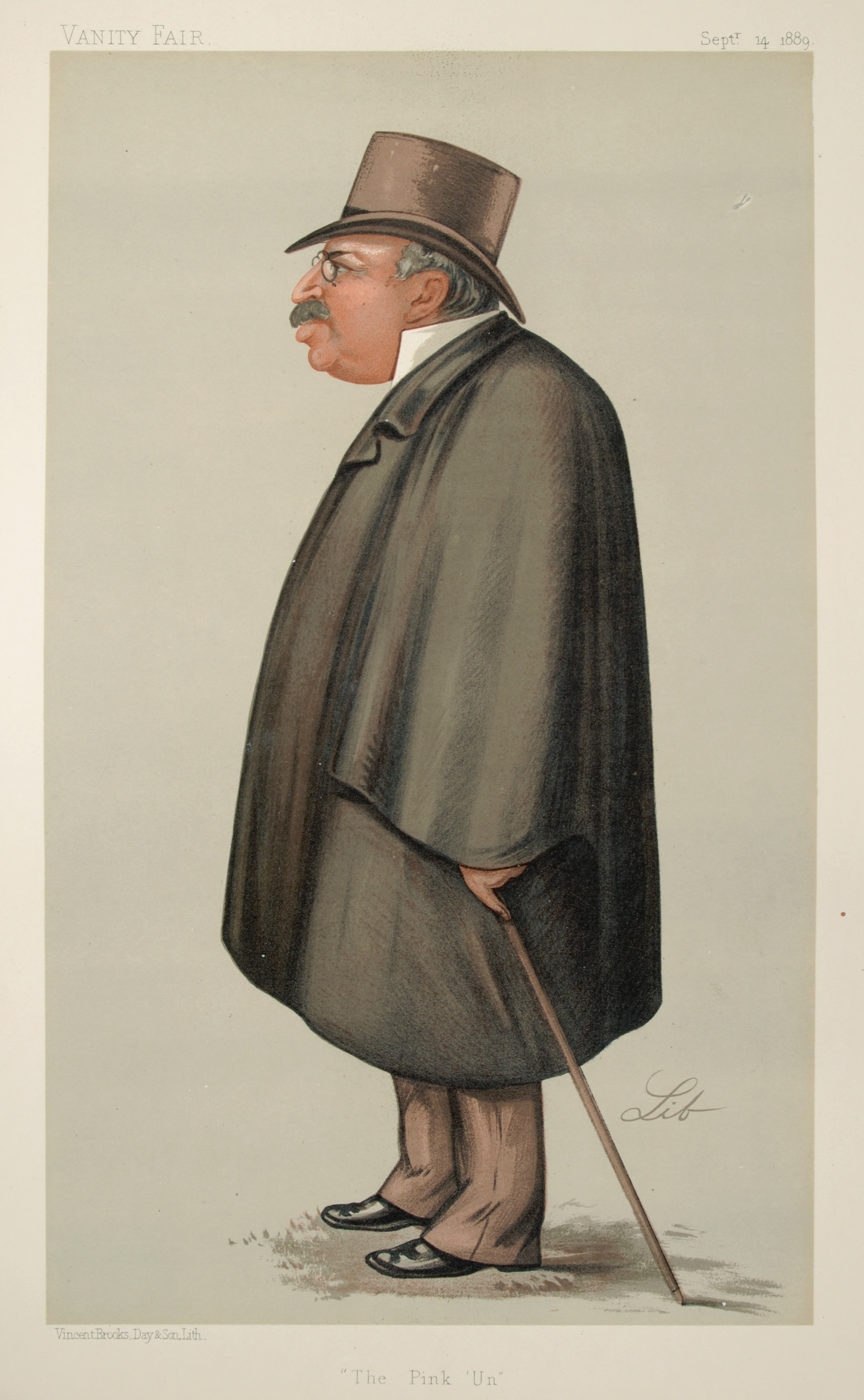
John Corlett, first editor of The Sporting Times, caricature in Vanity Fair, 1889

The Sporting Times (founded 1865, ceased publication 1932) was a weekly British newspaper devoted chiefly to sport, and in particular to horse racing. It was informally known as The Pink 'Un, as it was printed on pink paper.

== History ==
The paper was founded in 1865 by John Corlett, of Charlton Court, East Sutton, Kent, who was both its editor and its proprietor, and by Dr Joseph Henry Shorthouse. Corlett also wrote a column in the paper called 'Our Note Book' and was associated with it from 1865 to 1913. The Sporting Times was published on a Saturday, and its competitors included The Field, The Sportsman, the Sporting Life, and Bell's Life in London. According to Alexander Andrews's Chapters in the History of British Journalism, the paper thrived "less upon its racing news than upon its profusion of coarse and scurrilous scraps of tittle-tattle, representing 'society journalism' in its most degraded form".

In the 1870s the chess column of The Sporting Times was written by John Wisker (1846–1884), winner of the 1870 British Chess Championship.

On 14 September 1889 the magazine Vanity Fair carried one of its caricatures, printed in colour, of The Sporting Times editor John Corlett, subtitled The Pink 'Un.

In Sir Arthur Conan Doyle's story "The Adventure of the Blue Carbuncle", first published in the Strand Magazine in January 1892, Sherlock Holmes deduces that a man is keen on gambling by noticing that he has a copy of the paper, commenting - "When you see a man with whiskers of that cut and the 'Pink 'un' protruding out of his pocket, you can always draw him by a bet".

In 1922, under the heading "The Scandal of Ulysses", the paper reviewed the complete edition of James Joyce's novel Ulysses just published in Paris, its columnist "Aramis" writing trenchantly:

... appears to have been written by a perverted lunatic who has made a speciality of the literature of the latrine... I have no stomach for Ulysses... James Joyce is a writer of talent, but in Ulysses he has ruled out all the elementary decencies of life and dwells appreciatively on things that sniggering louts of schoolboys guffaw about. In addition to this stupid glorification of mere filth, the book suffers from being written in the manner of a demented George Meredith. There are whole chapters of it without any punctuation or other guide to what the writer is really getting at. Two-thirds of it is incoherent, and the passages that are plainly written are devoid of wit, displaying only a coarse salacrity [sic] intended for humour.

In Old Pink 'Un Days (1924) the sporting journalist J. B. Booth wrote about his work with the newspaper and its development, with anecdotes of the turf, the theatre, and boxing, and with frank accounts of some of the colourful characters of the worlds of sport and Fleet Street during the early twentieth century. He followed this up with A Pink 'Un Remembers (1937) and Sporting Times: The Pink 'Un World (1938).

The paper is mentioned in the novel Burmese Days by George Orwell:

Year after year you sit in Kipling-haunted little clubs, whisky to right of you, Pink'un to left of you, listening and eagerly agreeing while Colonel Bodger develops his theory that these bloody nationalists should be boiled in oil.

In P.G. Wodehouse's short story "Bingo and the Little Woman" Bertie Wooster reveals that, "bar a weekly wrestle with the Pink 'Un and an occasional dip into the form-book, I'm not much of a lad for reading".

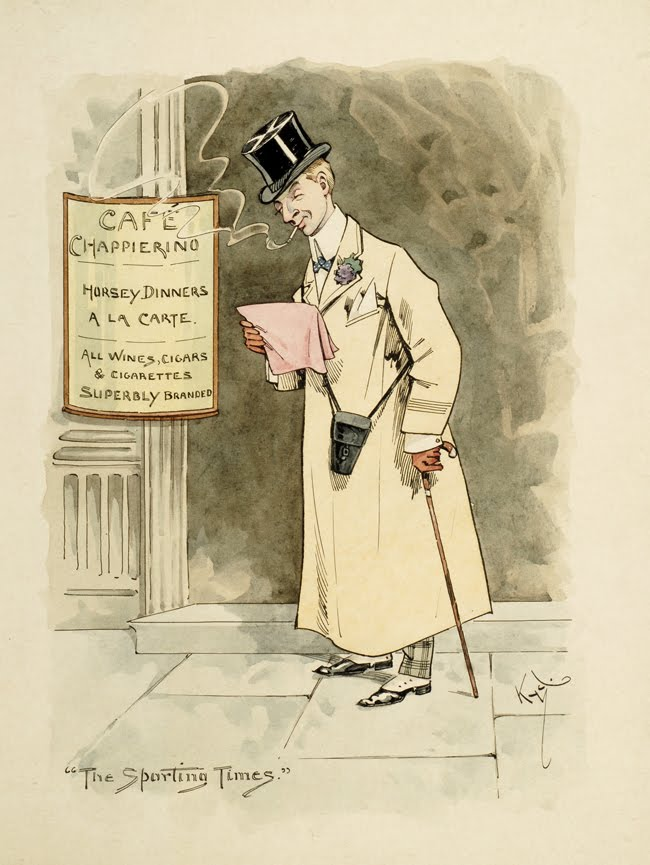
A Reader of The Sporting Times by Joseph Clayton Clark, c. 1900

The paper ceased publication in 1932.

Rudyard Kipling mentions The Sporting Times as The Pink 'Un in his autobiography Something of Myself (1937).

=== Origin of the Ashes ===
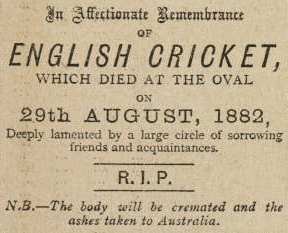
The death notice which first named the Ashes

On 29 August 1882, at the Oval, the England cricket team was beaten for the first time in a home Test match by Australia, and on 2 September The Sporting Times newspaper published a famous satirical death notice of English cricket, written by Reginald Shirley Brooks:

In Affectionate Remembrance

OF
ENGLISH CRICKET,
WHICH DIED AT THE OVAL
ON
29th AUGUST, 1882,
Deeply lamented by a large circle of sorrowing
friends and acquaintances.
R. I. P.

N.B.—The body will be cremated and the
ashes taken to Australia.

This notice followed a similar one which had appeared two days before in C. W. Alcock's Cricket: a Weekly Record of The Game, reading in full:

SACRED TO THE MEMORY OF ENGLAND'S SUPREMACY IN THE CRICKET-FIELD WHICH EXPIRED ON THE 29TH DAY OF AUGUST, AT THE OVAL: "ITS END WAS PEATE".

However, The Sporting Times was the first to refer to cremation and 'the ashes'.

The England cricket team toured Australia during the winter of 1882, and after it had won two out of three Tests its captain was presented with an urn containing the ashes of a cricket bail. Since then, The Ashes is the notional trophy England and Australia play for in Test match cricket. The urn is kept in the Lord's Cricket Ground museum. Due to its age and fragile condition, the original Ashes urn is not presented to the winning team; instead a Waterford Crystal trophy (first presented in 1999) and replica urns are presented.

The Sporting Times' mock-obituary has been caricatured many times, notably by Australia's Daily Telegraph in describing Australia's series loss to South Africa at the MCG in 2008:

RIP, Australian Cricket, slaughtered by South Africa, 30 December at the MCG, aided and abetted by incompetent selectors, inept batting, impotent bowling, dreadful catching, poor captaincy".

== See also ==
- Horseracing in the United Kingdom

== Bibliography ==
- Booth, J[ohn] B[ennion]., Old Pink 'Un Days (London, Grant Richards Ltd., 1924, 413pp.), includes an illustration by Phil May and a caricature by Ralph Rowland
- Booth, J. B., Master and Men: Pink 'Un Yesterdays (London, T. Werner Laurie Ltd., 1926, 380 pp.)
- Booth, J. B., London Town (London, T. Werner Laurie Ltd., 1929, 324pp.)
- Booth, J. B., Pink Parade (London, Thornton Butterworth, 1933, 317pp.), foreword by Charles B. Cochran
- Booth, J. B., A Pink 'Un Remembers (London, T. Werner Laurie Ltd., 1937, xx + 286 pp.), foreword by C. B. Cochran
- Booth, J. B., Sporting Times: The Pink 'Un World (London, T. Werner Laurie Ltd., 1938, xx + 284 pp.), foreword by Hugh Lowther, 5th Earl of Lonsdale KG
- Booth, J. B., Life, Laughter and Brass Hats (London, T. Werner Laurie Ltd., 1939, xvi + 334pp.)
- Booth, J. B., Palmy Days (London, The Richards Press, 1957, 232pp.), foreword by Sir Arthur Bryant
