= Tara, Chertsey =

Tara
- Location within Surrey

General information
- Type: Residential
- Architectural style: Modern
- Location: St Anns Hill, Chertsey, Surrey
- Coordinates: 51°23′40″N 0°31′13″W
- Construction started: 1968~
- Completed: 1968~
- Demolished: 1990

Technical details
- Floor count: 1

Tara was a house on St Anns Hill, Chertsey, Surrey owned by the Who's drummer Keith Moon in the 1970s, but was demolished and replaced by a new home in 1990. The press party for the release of the Who's Next album was held at Tara.

== Description ==
The house was a one-storey four-bedroom bungalow which enclosed approximately 100 square metres (1,100 sq ft). The roof peaked in five pyramids, one on each corner of the house and one in the centre over a large sunken lounge. It featured French windows, a master ensuite, a study and the lounge. The house was semi-transparent, minimalist modern style pioneered by public galleries and recording studios (such as Tittenhurst Park), and included futuristic appliances and labour-saving devices. The unusual roof emphasised post-war abstractism as opposed to art deco simplicity. The grounds included an extensive lawn, wooded areas and a large pond. The town centre was about 1 mile (1.6 km) away, beyond the foot of the knoll, stretching down as far as the Thames, along which some members of The Who had homes and mainly in their in early years performed, particularly at the hotel/dance venue, The Eel Pie at Eel Pie Island, Twickenham, London.

== History ==
The house was reportedly named Tara after the mansion in Gone with the Wind (1939). It was built by Peter Collison, film director of The Italian Job (1969) who blew up a Victorian home to film the demolition and built the contemporary home in its place.

In 1971 Keith Moon purchased the property from Collison for £65,000 (equivalent to £821,525 in 2025), and he and his wife Kim Kerrigan launched an eccentric and extravagant open-house social life based at the home. "People would come to deliver a pizza or do a mural and be there for weeks," reported author Richard Barnes.

In July 1971 the house and lawn of the property served as the venue for the Who's Next album launch party, and included an extravagant fireworks display. The Who also conducted photo sessions on the property. In 1972 Moon drove one of his cars into the garden pond.

In 1975 Moon sold the property to Kevin Godley of 10cc, and in 1990 Godley sold it to Vince Clarke of Erasure. Clarke had the contemporary building demolished, and constructed a home and studio on the site called Ammonite. Clarke put the property up for sale in 2003.
