= Old Town Hall, Chertsey =

Municipal building in Chertsey, Surrey, England

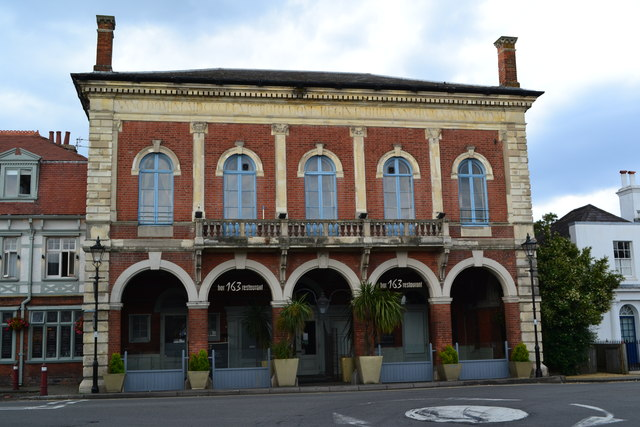
- Old Town Hall, Chertsey

- Shown in Surrey
- 51.3920°N 0.5027°W
- Location: London Street, Chertsey

History
- Built: 1851

Site notes
- Architect: George Briand
- Architectural style: Italianate style

Listed Building – Grade II
- Official name: Town Hall
- Designated: 9 June 1972
- Reference no.: 1295138

The Old Town Hall is a municipal building in London Road, Chertsey, Surrey, England. The structure, which was the main civic venue for the town, is a Grade II listed building.

== History ==
The first municipal building in the town was a 17th century market hall at the junction of London Street and Guildford Street. It was arcaded on the ground floor, so that markets could be held, with an assembly room on the first floor. It also incorporated a lock-up for petty criminals. However, it obstructed the view of St Peter's Church and, after it became dilapidated, it was demolished in 1809. A second market house was then erected in Bridge Street in 1810.

In the middle of the 19th century civic leaders decided to replace the second market house with a new structure. The new building was designed by George Briand in the Italianate style, built in red brick with stone dressings at a cost of £1,700 and was completed in 1851. The design involved a symmetrical main frontage with five bays facing onto London Road; it was also arcaded on the ground floor, so that markets could be held, with an assembly room on the first floor. There were five round headed windows on the first floor with a projecting balcony in front of the central three windows. The windows were flanked by pilasters supporting an entablature and a dentilled cornice. Internally, the principal room was the assembly room which was accessed by a grand staircase. Petty session hearings were held in the assembly room on alternate Wednesdays.

Following significant population growth, largely associated with the status of Chertsey as a market town, the area became an urban district in 1894. The new council chose to use the town hall as an events venue and established offices for council officers and their departments, initially in Guildford Street, and then, from 1962, in Station Road in Addlestone.

Important events which took place at the town hall include the appearance of the former Paymaster General, Archibald Boyd-Carpenter, on the balcony of the town hall following his election as the local member of parliament in the 1931 general election. The town hall also made a fleeting appearance in the 1964 classic film, First Men in the Moon, when it stood in for Dymchurch Town Hall, and it served as the home of the Chertsey Museum from its formation in 1965 until its relocation to The Cedars in Windsor Street in 1972.

The importance of the building as a civic amenity declined following the formation of the enlarged Runnymede Borough Council in 1974. An extensive programme of refurbishment works were completed in August 2000; these works involved the conversion of the ground floor into a restaurant; subsequent works involved the conversion of the first floor into apartments.
