= Blanche Heriot =

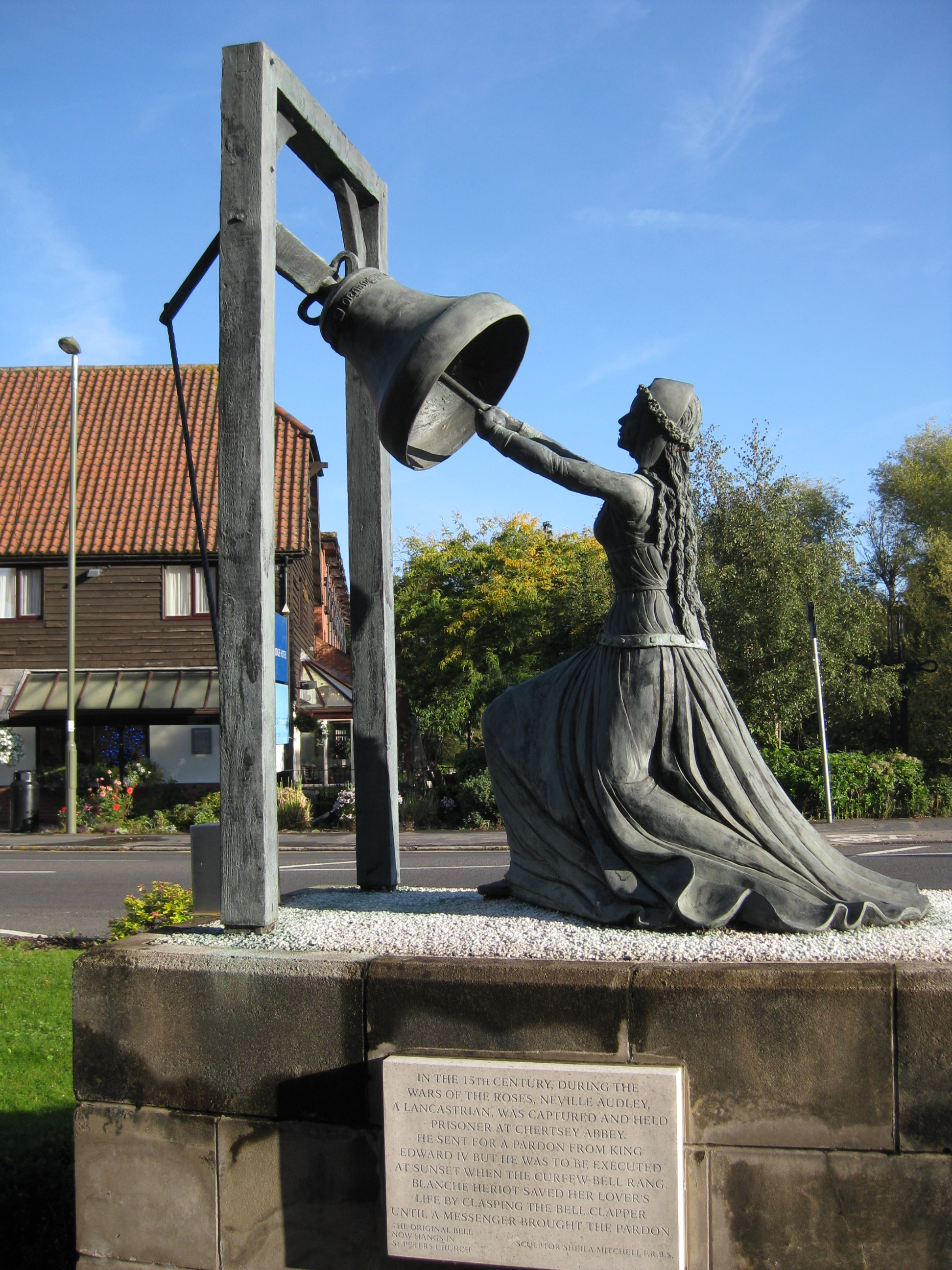
Statue of Blanche Heriot in Chertsey

Blanche Heriot was a legendary heroine from Chertsey, Surrey, whose story was brought to a wider public in two works by the Chertsey-born early Victorian writer Albert Smith.

== Background ==
In 1842 Smith's first play, Blanche Heriot, or The Chertsey Curfew, was produced at the Surrey Theatre. "As a native of Chertsey," wrote Henry Turner in Clement Scott's magazine The Theatre, "he was naturally acquainted with the local legend of the heroic girl who, in order to gain time for her lover's pardon to arrive, and so save his head from 'rolling on the Abbey mead,' clung to the clapper of the enormous bell in the belfry tower, and thereby attained her object." The Irish actress Maria Honner "was the heroine and her portrait (life-size) was on every hoarding in London, swinging to and fro with her hair streaming in the wind."

In 1843, Smith published The Wassail-Bowl: A Comic Christmas Sketchbook, Volume II of which included a short story, "Blanche Heriot: A Legend of Old Chertsey Church", on the same subject as his play of the previous year. A summary of "Blanche Heriot: A Legend of Old Chertsey Church" follows.

== Synopsis ==
Blanche Heriot is a young woman, living in Chertsey during the Wars of the Roses. The story is set in May 1471 when Edward IV of England, the first and longest-serving Yorkist King, has just won back the throne from his cousin.

Blanche has a lover, Neville Audley, who has been away in the wars, fighting for the Lancastrians. He returns to Chertsey with a price on his head and is intent on fleeing to the Continent. However, he is apprehended by Yorkist soldiers in Chertsey. He kills one soldier and a dog and flees to Chertsey Abbey, seeking sanctuary.

Neville, however, is arrested and sentenced to die at curfew the next day. A mutual friend of Blanche and Neville, Herrick Evenden, agrees to take a token (a ring given to Neville by a nobleman from the Yorkist side for Neville sparing his life) to London to call in that favour by in turn sparing Neville's life. With only five minutes to go before curfew bell will toll, Herrick is seen by townsfolk approaching Laleham ferry, half a mile away, on his return from London. Realising that Neville's life depends on her delaying the curfew, Blanche runs to the bell tower and ascends the old stairs. She crouches down beneath the bell and clings onto the clapper. Despite being dashed against the bell and frame, she holds on until the sexton (accompanied by soldiers) decides to climb the tower to investigate. Just then, Herrick Evenden arrives with a pardon for Neville. Following his release, a party ensues at the local hostelry, and Neville and Blanche are married shortly afterwards.

Albert Smith completes the story with a reference to the motto inscribed around the band of the Curfew Bell, "Ora mente pia pro nobis, Virgo Maria". This was the fifth bell in the ring of eight at the medieval parish church, St. Peter's, Chertsey. It was cast circa 1310 and re-cast circa 1380 for Chertsey Abbey by the Wokingham founders who were linked to the Abbey. On the dissolution of Chertsey Abbey in July 1537, it was moved from the abbey church just behind the other medieval church, which was left for plunder of its stone.

== Related matters ==
A bronze statue of Blanche Heriot by Sheila Mitchell F.R.B.S stands in Chertsey.

Lydia Sigourney wrote an article, "Love and Loyalty", which appeared posthumously in Peterson's Magazine in September 1865. This is highly likely to be based on the Blanche Heriot story. It was then picked up and formed the basis of the narrative poem "Curfew Must Not Ring Tonight" by Rose Hartwick Thorpe in 1867.

The main specialist gynaecology clinic of St Peter's Hospital, Chertsey is the Blanche Heriot Unit in her honour.
