= Chertsey =

Town in Surrey, England

Coordinates: 51.3902°N 0.5074°W

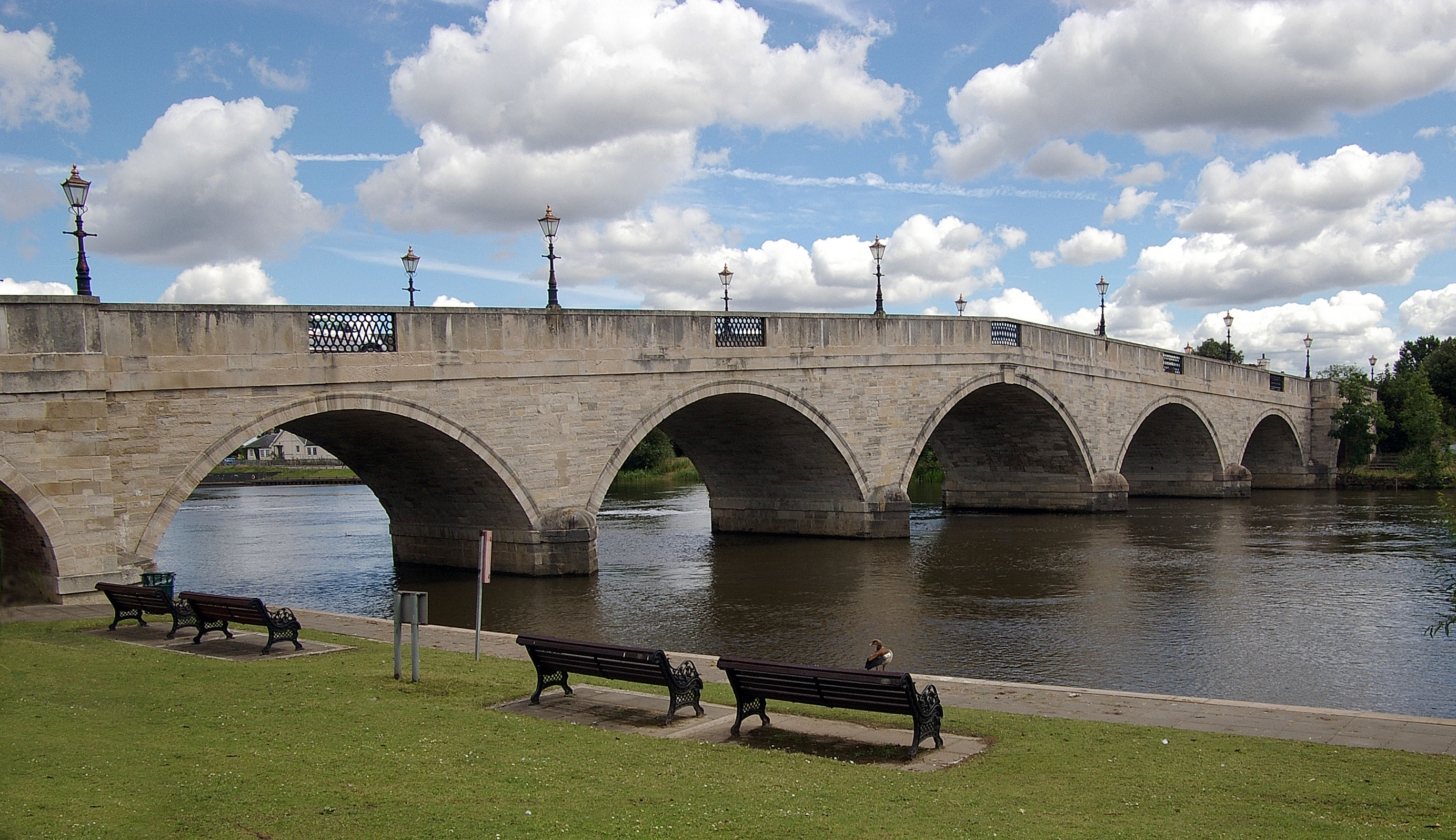
- Chertsey Bridge

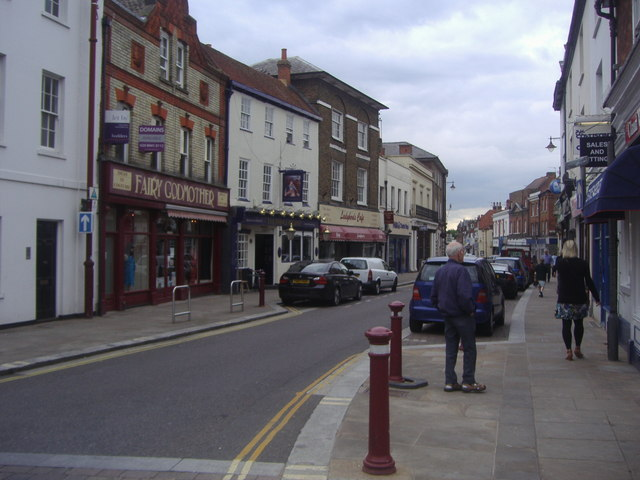
- Guildford Street; The principal Shopping Street with an adjoining arcade and supermarket.

- Location within Surrey
- Population: 15,967
- OS grid reference: TQ039667
- District: Runnymede
- Shire county: Surrey
- Region: South East
- Country: England
- Sovereign state: United Kingdom
- Post town: Chertsey
- Postcode district: KT16
- Dialling code: 01932
- Police: Surrey
- Fire: Surrey
- Ambulance: South East Coast
- UK Parliament: Runnymede and Weybridge

Chertsey is a town in the Borough of Runnymede in Surrey, England, 18 miles (29 km) south-west of central London. It grew up around Chertsey Abbey, founded in AD 666 by St Erkenwald, and gained a market charter from Henry I. A bridge across the River Thames first appeared in the early 15th century.

The River Bourne through the town meets the Thames at Weybridge. The Anglican church has a medieval tower and chancel roof. The 18th-century listed buildings include the current stone Chertsey Bridge and Botleys Mansion. A curfew bell, rung at 8pm on weekdays from Michaelmas to Lady Day ties with the romantic local legend of Blanche Heriot, marked by a statue of her and the bell at Chertsey Bridge. Green areas include the Thames Path National Trail, Chertsey Meads and a round knoll (St Ann's Hill) with remains of a prehistoric hill fort known as Eldebury Hill. Pyrcroft House dates from the 18th century and Tara from the late 20th.

Train services are run between Chertsey railway station and London Waterloo by South Western Railway. The town is within the M25, accessible via junction 11. It has a population of 15,967.

== Toponymy ==
The first written mention of Chertsey is by Bede c. 750, in which he describes the location as Cerotaesei, id est Ceroti insula (translated as "Chertsey, that is the island of Cerotus"). The settlement appears in 13th-century copies of 7th-century charters as Cirotesige, Cirotesge and Cerotesge. The manor is recorded as Certesi in Domesday Book in 1086 and as Certeseye in 1129–30. Other later forms include Charteseye (mid-14th century), Charsey (in 1543) and Chutsey (in 1606). The first use of the modern spelling "Chertsey" is from 1559.

The first part of the toponym "Chertsey" is thought to refer to a Celtic individual, whose name was subsequently Latinised to Cerotus. The second part derives from the Old English ēg and means "island or well-watered land".

== History ==
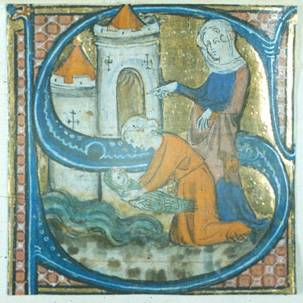
folio 6r of a Breviary of Chertsey Abbey

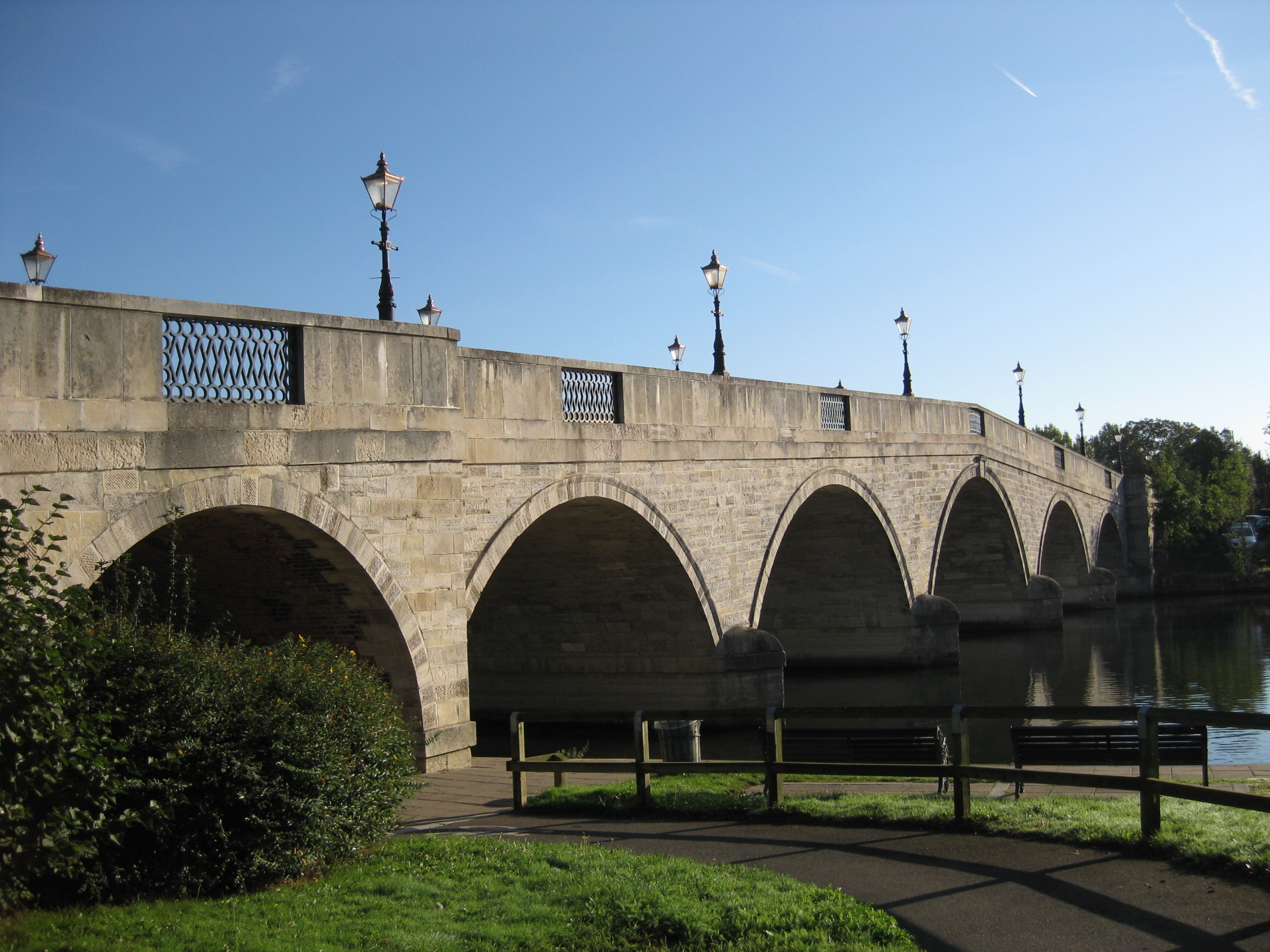
Chertsey Bridge is the Thames crossing (Note: Reducing traffic greatly; the Chertsey M3 motorway bridge is 500m to the north.) showing the Georgian architecture of James Paine and 1930s lamps

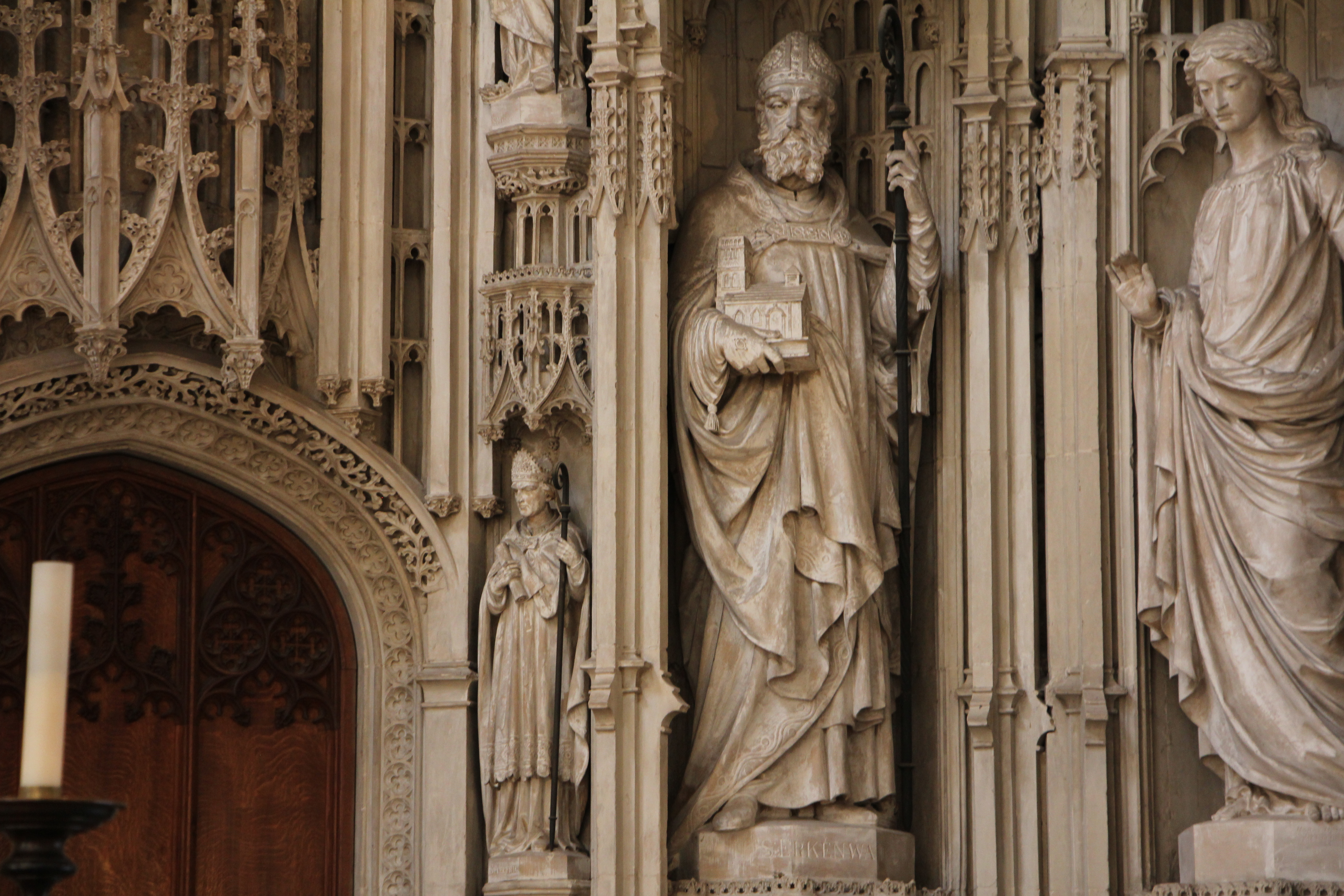
Statue of Erkenwald, Bishop of London and founder of the abbey

Chertsey is one of the oldest market towns in England. Its Church of England parish church dates to the 12th century (see below) and the farmhouse of the Hardwick in the elevated southwest is of 16th-century construction. It grew to all sides but the north around Chertsey Abbey, founded in 666 A.D. by Eorcenwald, Bishop of London, using a donation by Frithwald. Until the end of use of the hundreds, used in the feudal system until the establishment of Rural Districts and Urban District Councils, the name chosen for the wider Chertsey area hundred was Godley Hundred.

In the 9th century, the abbey and town were sacked by the Danes, leaving a mark today in the name of the neighbouring village, Thorpe, and refounded as a subsidiary abbey from Abingdon Abbey by King Edgar in 964.

Chertsey appears in the Domesday Book as Certesi. It was held partly by Chertsey Abbey and partly by Richard Sturmid from the abbey. Its Domesday assets were: 5 hides, 1 mill and 1 forge at the hall, 20 ploughs, 80 hectares of meadow, woodland worth 50 hogs. It rendered a larger than average sum for the book of manor and ecclesiastical parish entries, £22.

=== Chertsey Abbey ===
The abbey grew to become one of the largest Benedictine abbeys in England, supported by large fiefs in the northwest corner of Sussex and Surrey until it was dissolved by Henry VIII in 1536. The King took stone from the abbey to construct his palace at Oatlands Palace; the villagers also used stone for raising the streets. By the late 17th century, only some outer walls of the abbey remained. During this period until at least 1911 a wider area was included in Chertsey: Ottershaw (and Brox) was an ecclesiastical district; whose church-sponsored (first built) schools were built in 1870, so too was Addlestone.

Today the history of the abbey is reflected in local place names and the surviving former fishponds that fill with water after heavy rain. The nearby Hardwick Court Farm, now much reduced in size and cut off from the town by the M25, has the successor to the abbey's large and well-supported 15th-century tithe barn, mostly rebuilt in the 17th century.

The eighteenth-century Chertsey Bridge provides an important cross-river link, and Chertsey Lock is a short distance above it on the opposite side. On the south west corner of the bridge is a bronze statue of local heroine Blanche Heriot striking the bell by Sheila Mitchell^{FRBS}.

The summit of St Ann's Hill in Chertsey was a vital viewing point for the Anglo-French Survey, which calculated the distance between the Royal Greenwich Observatory and the Paris Observatory using trigonometry. A grid of triangles was measured all the way to the French coast, to join up with the French survey; St Ann's Hill was crucial for the link with the base-line of the English survey on Hounslow Heath.

In the 18th century, Chertsey Cricket Club was one of the strongest in the country and beat the rest of England (excluding Hampshire) by more than an innings in 1778. The Duke of Dorset, (who played cricket for Chertsey), was appointed Ambassador to France in 1784. He arranged to have the Chertsey cricket team travel to France in 1789 to introduce cricket to the French nobility. However, the team, on arriving at Dover, met the Ambassador returning from France at the outset of the French Revolution and the opportunity was missed.

The original Chertsey railway station was built by the London and Southampton Railway and opened on 14 February 1848. The present station, across the level crossing from the site of the original one, was opened on 10 October 1866 by the London and South Western Railway. The Southern Railway completed electrification of the line on 3 January 1937.

Samuel Lewis devotes one of his longest entries to the small town in his 1848 topographical guide to England:

...a market-town and parish, and the head of a union... 13 miles [21 km] (N. N. E.) from Guildford, and 20 [miles (30 km)] (W. S. W.) from London; containing 5347 inhabitants. During the Heptarchy, the South Saxon kings had their residence in this town (Note: While the Saxon Kings had a residence here the town of Kingston upon Thames was for several centuries after this their main residence.); and it became noted for a Benedictine monastery, founded in 666 by Erkenwald...which, having been burnt to the ground in the war with the Danes, was refounded by King Edgar, and dedicated to St. Peter. In this abbey Henry VI was privately interred; but his remains were subsequently removed, and deposited, with appropriate solemnities, in the Chapel Royal. At the dissolution, its [annual] revenue was £774. 13. 6.: some portions of the outer walls remain, and on the site, and with part of the materials, of the abbey, a private mansion, called the Abbey House, was erected, but this was pulled down some years ago.

The town is pleasantly situated upon the Thames...the houses are in general neatly built of brick; the streets are partially paved, and lighted, and the inhabitants are plentifully supplied with water from springs. A neat building, of which the first stone was laid in November 1838, by the high sheriff of the county, has been erected for a literary and scientific institution. The trade is principally in malt and flour; the manufacture of coarse thread, and the making of iron-hoops and brooms, are carried on to a considerable extent; and a great quantity of bricks is also made in the neighbourhood. The town is about three miles [5 km] from the Weybridge station...an act was passed in 1846 for a branch railway... The river Wey Navigation and canal passes...two miles [3 km] [away from Chertsey]...conveyance for the several articles of manufacture, and for large quantities of vegetables, which are cultivated in the environs for the London market. The market, chartered by Queen Elizabeth in 1559, is on Wednesday: the fairs are on the first Monday and Tuesday in Lent, for cattle; 14 May, for sheep; and 6 August and 25 September, for toys and pedlery. A court of pie-poudre is attached to the fair in Lent. The county magistrates hold...and headboroughs and other officers are appointed...at the court leet of the lord of the manor, who also holds a court baron on the following day at Hardwick Court, now a farmhouse, but once the manorial mansion, in which Henry VI resided when a child. ...county debt-court of Chertsey, established in 1847...

The parish comprises about 10,020 acres [4,050 ha]. The living is a vicarage, valued in the king's books at £13. 12. 4.; net income, £307; patrons, alternately, the Haberdashers' Company, and the governors of Christ's Hospital; impropriators, the landowners. The church, a handsome structure in the later English style, with a square embattled tower, was built with money raised on annuities, in 1808; it contains a tablet to the memory of the celebrated orator and statesman, Charles James Fox, and several monuments to the Mawbey family. A church has been built at Addlestone and...Independents and Methodists. A school was founded in 1725, by Sir William Perkins, who endowed it with £3000 Bank stock, which sum, augmented by an accumulating annual surplus, produces at present nearly £400 per annum; the school has been extended upon the national plan. The tolls and profits arising from stallage in the market and fairs were granted by Queen Elizabeth to the poor, for whose benefit there are various other charitable benefactions, among them a sum of nearly £4000, left by Miss Mary Giles, who died in 1841. The union...contains a population of 14,929. Near the town is St. Ann's Hill, commanding an extensive prospect, formerly the residence of...Fox, and in which are some tessellated pavements, collected from the ruins of the abbey: the water of St. Ann's Well was once in repute for its efficacy in curing diseases of the eye. The poet Cowley lived for some time in an ancient house in the town, called Cowley House, in which he died; and Mr. Day, author of Sandford and Merton, resided in the vicinity.

Chertsey Regatta has been held on the river for over 150 years, which is in the non-Olympic regional sport of skiffing which has a club on this reach of river. Similarly the Olympic sport of rowing (in racing shells) has an annual Burway Regatta above Chertsey Lock, an area of former flood meadow, reservoirs and golf course. The Burway was in the medieval period let out by the abbey as over 200 acres (0.81 km^{2}) of grazing pasture (and remains postally associated with the town). The Burway faces Laleham Park, the largest municipal park of a neighbouring borough.

Chertsey was the home of Charles James Fox, who had wished to be buried there but instead is buried in Westminster Abbey. The nearby estate that is now the large Foxhills Golf Estate, Spa and Restaurant, close to Ottershaw and Lyne, was named in honour of him, but was not his home.

A long history of metal working exists, and from the 19th century a prosperous bell foundry, Eldridge, was in Windsor Street. Herrings, an iron foundry, flourished during the 19th century and was situated in Gogmore Lane.

The Chertsey troop of the Berkshire Yeomanry occupied the Drill Hall on Drill Hall Road since 1977. The unit has close ties with the borough and was granted the freedom of Runnymede in 2009. The Drill Hall closed at the end of March 2010 and the troop had to return to Windsor due to cuts in the Territorial Army in 2009–2010.

== Geography ==
=== Location and topography ===
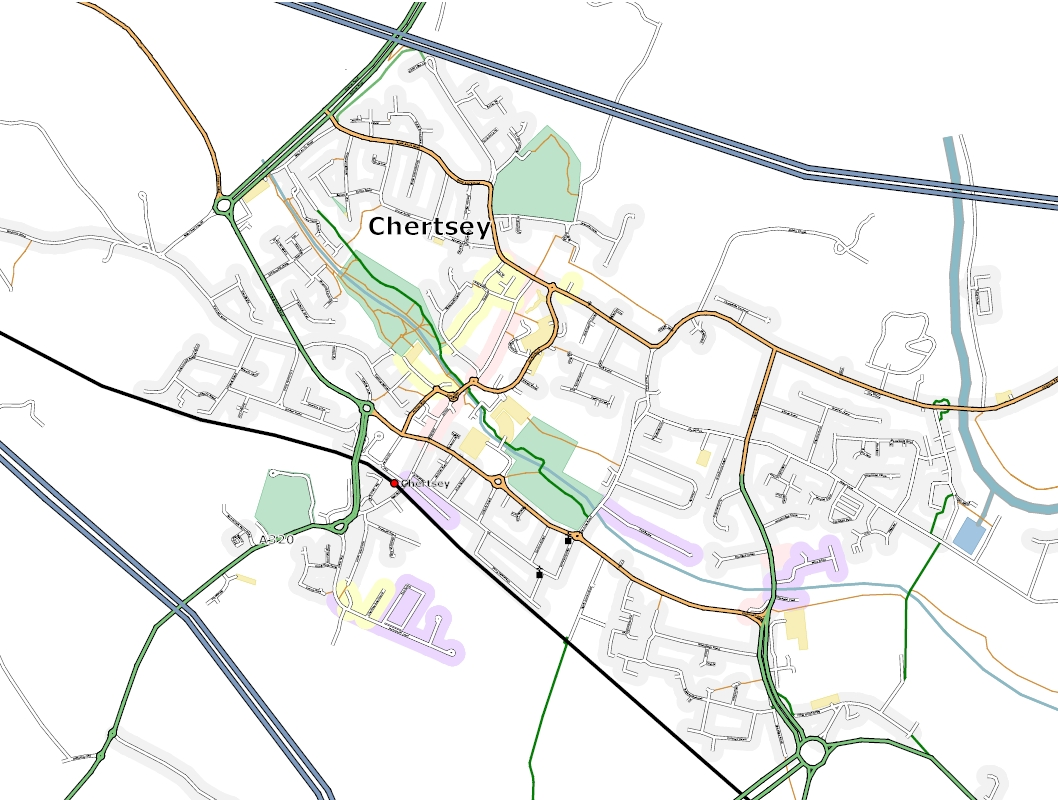
Simple road and watercourse map of the urban and suburban majority of Chertsey, which continues on postal, ecclesiastical parochial and ward definitions to the north and to the south-west.

Chertsey is part of the London commuter belt in the outermost part of the Greater London Urban Area and is served by Chertsey railway station and separated from all adjoining settlements by the buffer of designated areas of Green Belt. Measuring from centre to centre, Chertsey is 29 kilometres (18 mi) from London, 2.5 kilometres (1.6 mi) from Addlestone, and 17.6 kilometres (10.9 mi) from the county town, Guildford. The traditional, yet commercially important town centre is a conservation area, joined by an arcade to a medium-sized supermarket and car park to the south.

The character of this central area is that of a traditional small town, with relatively narrow building frontages set hard up against the pavement, so that they clearly define the public space. The centre of the town is richly endowed with listed buildings most of which date from the 16th and 17th centuries. In addition to the more than 56 numbered houses/shops (42 buildings) nationally listed buildings, nine other buildings in the conservation area are locally listed. A further 11 buildings outside the centre are also nationally listed.

Elevation is generally low at 14m in the Town Centre and 11 m on the River Thames at Chertsey Bridge, making it the lowest place in Chertsey. The highest point is on the peak of wooded and inhabited St. Ann's Hill which reaches an elevation of 77 m, making it the second-highest point in Runnymede. Across Chertsey bridge, pictured, on the Middlesex side of the river is the Thames Path National Trail and Chertsey Lock.

=== Geology ===
Chertsey town centre lies on a floodplain terrace between the River Thames to the north and The Bourne to the south. Much of the terrace consists of river gravels deposited on the sandy Bagshot Beds, which in turn overlie the London Clay. The soil in this area is loamy and the water table is naturally high.

St Ann's Hill appears as an island of Tertiary strata, surrounded by river deposits. The hill is composed primarily of the Bagshot Beds, but is capped by Bracklesham Clays with a thick pebble bed. South west of the town centre, the chert and flint pebble deposits at Cockcrow Hill and Sandgates were probably deposited by an earlier course of The Bourne.

== Economy ==
Aside from being a London "commuter town", Chertsey is home to the head office of Compass Group, and the UK head office and European headquarters of Samsung Electronics. Samsung moved there in 2005; previously the Samsung offices were in New Malden.

Thorpe Park, part of Merlin Entertainments Ltd, is on the northern boundary, connected by frequent buses from Staines-upon-Thames and Chertsey.

== Landmarks ==
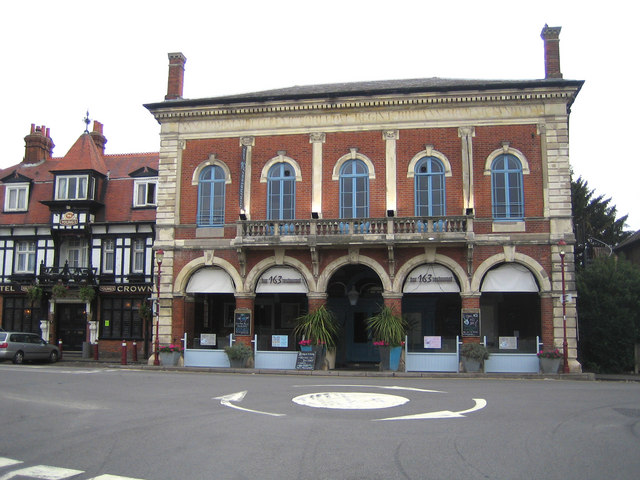
The Old Town Hall

=== Chertsey Bridge ===
Chertsey Bridge is a Scheduled Ancient Monument and Grade II* listed structure that has a listed City (of London tax) Post at one end, and nearby milestones. It is predominantly of ashlar light stone with two white flagstone york stone pavements with a low weight limit and narrow carriageways inappropriate to HGVs, which have Staines Bridge, Walton Bridge or motorway alternatives to reach Spelthorne.

Samuel Lewis included it in his opening description of the town above: "...[River Thames] over which is a handsome stone bridge of seven arches, built in 1785, at an expense of £13,000, defrayed jointly by the counties of Surrey and Middlesex..." It was built in 1783–1785 by James Paine.

=== Museum ===
Chertsey has an admission-free museum on Windsor Street, which provides considerable information about the history of Chertsey.

The museum holds the Olive Matthews costume collection, which is of national importance, contains around three thousand pieces of costume and was donated by Matthews to the museum in 1969.

The museum contains clocks by two local makers, James Douglass and Henry Wale Cartwright. (Note however that there were three successive watchmakers called James Douglass (or Douglas) in the Douglas family, the latter based in Egham)

=== Hospital ===
St. Peter's Hospital, originally intended to serve casualties of World War II, formally came into being on 12 September 1939. It now has 400 beds and a wide range of acute care services, on the straight A road to Woking close to the much younger parish of Ottershaw. Hospital Radio Wey has been broadcasting to the patients and staff of St Peter's Hospital since 1965 and now also broadcasts on the internet as RadioWey.

=== St Peter's Church ===
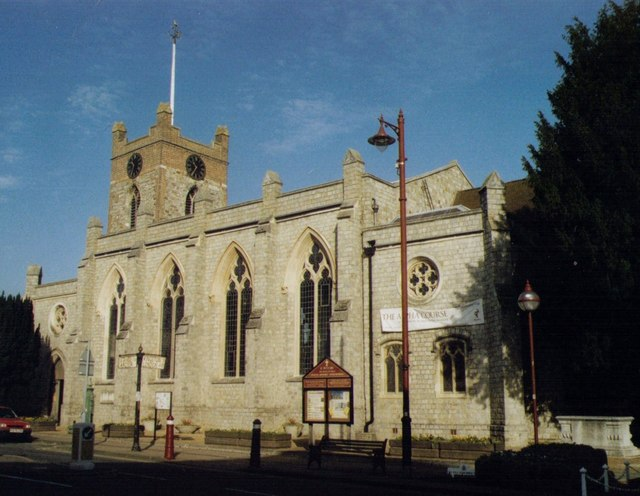
Church of St Peter

St Peter's church has a 13th/14th-century west tower (with 18th-century bricks above the belfry) and east chancel; a collection of the abbey's paving tiles is in its sanctuary; several are also in the British Museum and a 15th-century chancel roof. St Peter's is surrounded by many Grade II listed buildings in the three mixed shopping and residential streets of the town centre however is Grade II* listed building.

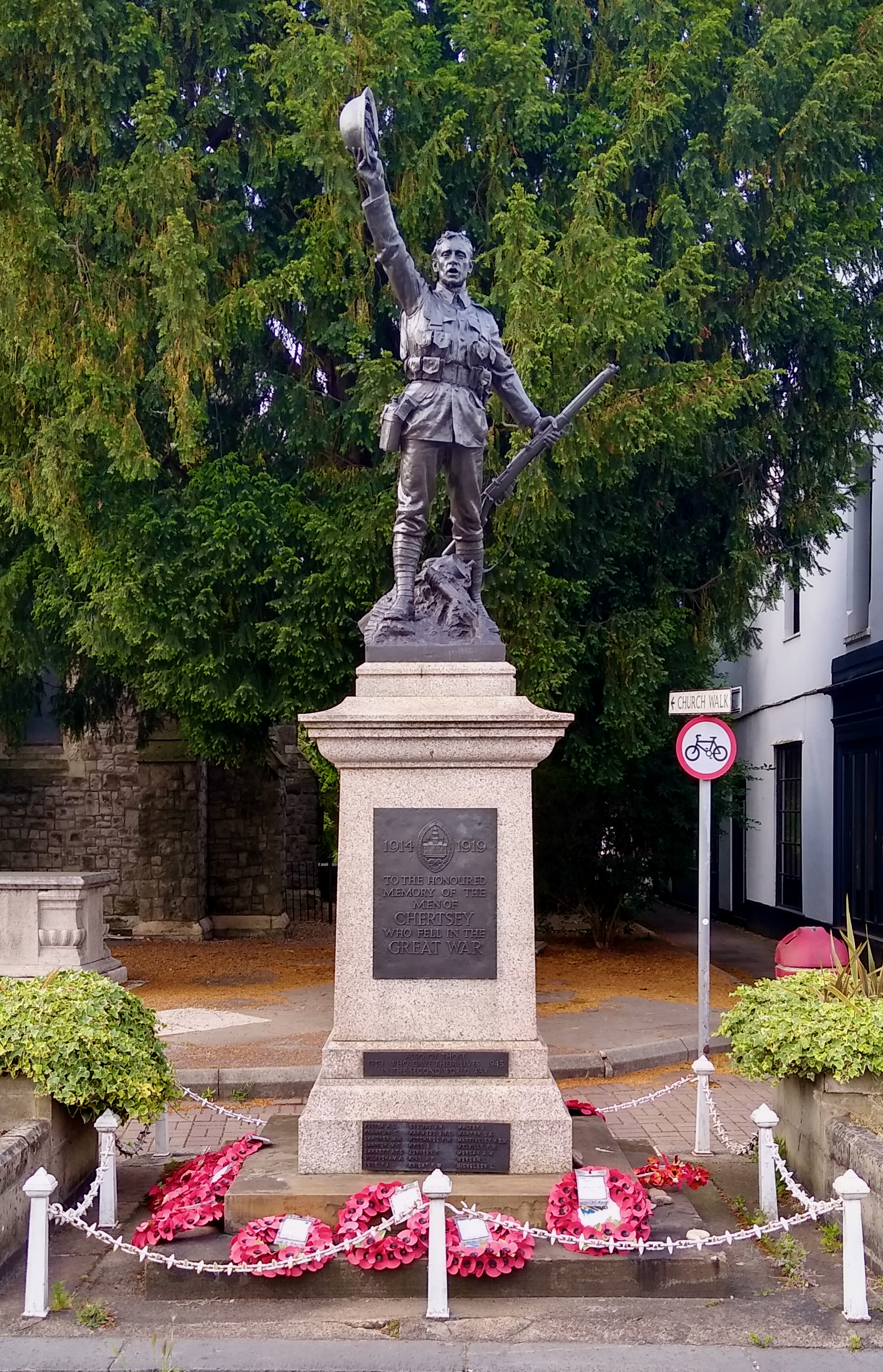
Chertsey War Memorial, outside St Peter's Church

=== Curfew House and 25 Windsor Street ===
Curfew House is four narrow houses west of the church, a taller red brick building in a group of five buildings of the same era; the name derives from the cruel King John and Blanche Heriot history and story which took place in the town centre. Below an open pediment are brick pilasters with moulded wood cornice, with dentils. Brick-coped gable ends front the street. Enriched wood architrave features as part of its entrance door and reeded panels with raised centres. Its keystone is dated 1725, inside a Tympanum is inscribed: "c5 Founded by Sr Wm PERKINS KBE For Fifty Children clothed and taught Go and do likewise".

25 Windsor Street is also at Grade II* architecturally, early C18 however a larger three-storey house in brown brick with a tile roof, nipped. A moulded wood eaves cornice, altered, has supporting brackets. Five sash windows with bars make up the windows. A central entrance encased door has an open pediment in the Tuscan order with flat pilasters. Radial bars segment its arched fanlight. At the top floor is a stone moulded band; the middle floor band is also rendered; the ground floor band is lined and painted. Red gauged brick flat arches top the windows with window dressings and quoins. Its front railings have spearhead bars and metal standards with vases, gadrooned.

=== Pyrcroft House ===
Pyrcroft House on Pyrcroft Road leading to St Ann's Hill is a Grade II* listed building that was referenced by Nikolaus Pevsner and has a brick front with gauged flat arches to its windows, supplemented by square brick pilasters to the corners. Moulded brick cornice underlies a parapet (flat/almost flat) roof. Carved stone vases ornament the masonry in the corners; a band of rendering marks off the first floor. A large centre first floor window is arched with stone keystone and impost blocks, radial bars at its head. Other windows are all sash windows with bars; 12 paned. Its entrance door has a Regency period framing of its door. Wood panelling with subdued embellishment decorates the rooms.

=== Botley Park and Bournewood House ===
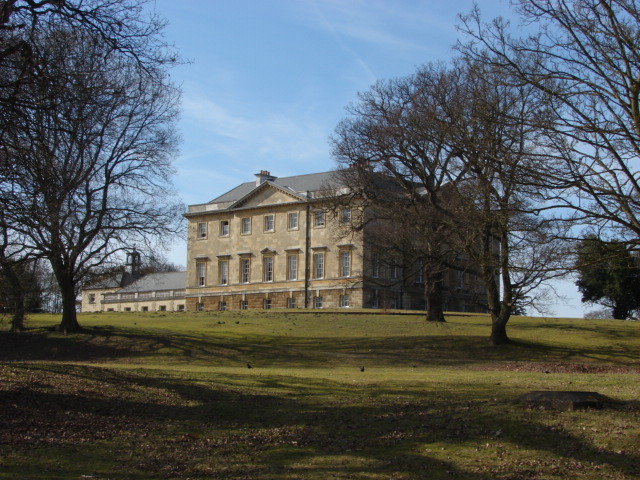
Botley Park Mansion

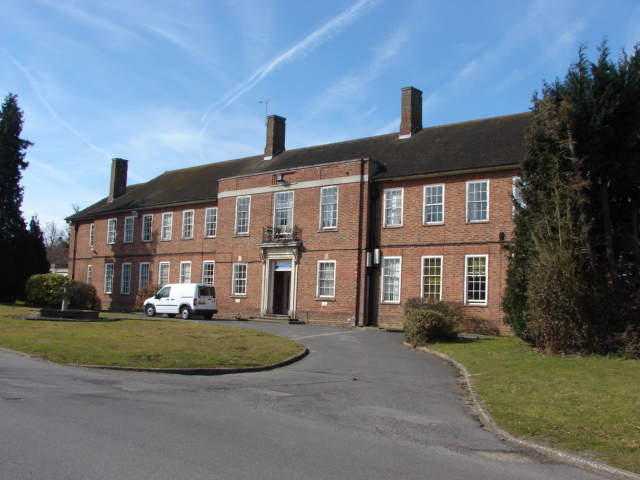
Bournewood House

Owner Joseph Mawbey had architect Kenton Couse build this substantial Georgian building surrounded by a manicured estate, now a private nursing home. U-shaped it is a rectangle of three storeys with seven windows to each of the four fronts, built of ashlar its ground floor is rusticated with a modillion eaves cornice; a parapet roof tops the structure. Each front has three centre window bays that project slightly with a pediment above and their original glazing bars intact. Ground floor windows have keystones. Upper windows have moulded architraves, those on 1st floor with cornices over, the centre one with a pediment. On the north front, the centre projection has four engaged Ionic columns with a pediment above containing a cartouche flanked by swags of husks; a piano nobile to one side connects the middle floor with a doorway with a rectangular fanlight, approached by a horse-shoe shaped stair connected with doorway by a bridge, beneath which is the service entrance to the ground floor below. Two fronts are prolonged in the same style by large modern additions. Entrance has a good hall with screen of four Ionic columns and a high plaster ceiling. Other good ceilings and doorcases to principal rooms on 1st floor. Bournewood House is part of Bournewood Park Hospital a central building in a large medical NHS trust adjoining St Peter's Hospital, formerly a nursing wing of the above hospital when it was run from the Victorian period as a mental hospital or asylum retreat.

== Sport and leisure ==
=== Football ===
Chertsey has a Non-League football club, Chertsey Town F.C. who play at Alwyns Lane. Chertsey Town F.C. won the FA Vase at Wembley in 2018/19. The town is also home to Dial Square F.C., who have ground-shared with The Curfews since August 2022.

=== Chertsey Meads ===
Chertsey Meads adjoin a start of a southern variant of the Thames Path on the south bank from where the path crosses the river at Chertsey Bridge. On the north of this park is the main Thameside development, the Bridge Wharf estate, through which passes this strand of the Thames Path, the long northern border then follows the Thames towards Addlestone to the confluence, by private houses, on the south side of the River Bourne, Chertsey. Narrower parks and allotments, interspersed by relatively few developments, follow this brook upstream through the town centre, which rises a few miles above Virginia Water (the actual lake of the same name as the more recent settlement as a whole) to its north and south. Much of its upper catchment area still remains Crown Estate.

Altogether the open space covers 70 hectares (170 acres). Nearby across Bridge Street by the bridge, to the north of this, is the Chertsey Camping and Caravanning Club Site There is another camping site at Laleham Park on the opposite bank of the Thames.

Annually, in early August, the Chertsey Agricultural Show is held here.

=== Great Cockcrow Railway ===
This 7.25" gauge miniature railway, off Hardwick Lane, opened in September 1968.

=== The Black Cherry Fair ===
This is an annual event on the 2nd Saturday of July each year with live music and refreshments. The fair began in 1440 when King Henry VI granted a fair on St Ann's Hill. It was to be held on July 12th which was the feast of St Ann. In the 1500s the fair transferred into Chertsey. It survived into the 20th Century but was suspended in World War 2, and not revived until 1975.

== Education ==
Schools in Chertsey include;

- St Anne's Roman Catholic primary school
- Salesian Catholic Secondary School (split site)
- Pyrcroft Grange Primary (former split site)
- Stepgates Community School
- Sir William Perkins's School, independent girls' school established originally for boys and girls in 1725.
- Chertsey High School (opened in 2017)

=== Chertsey High School ===
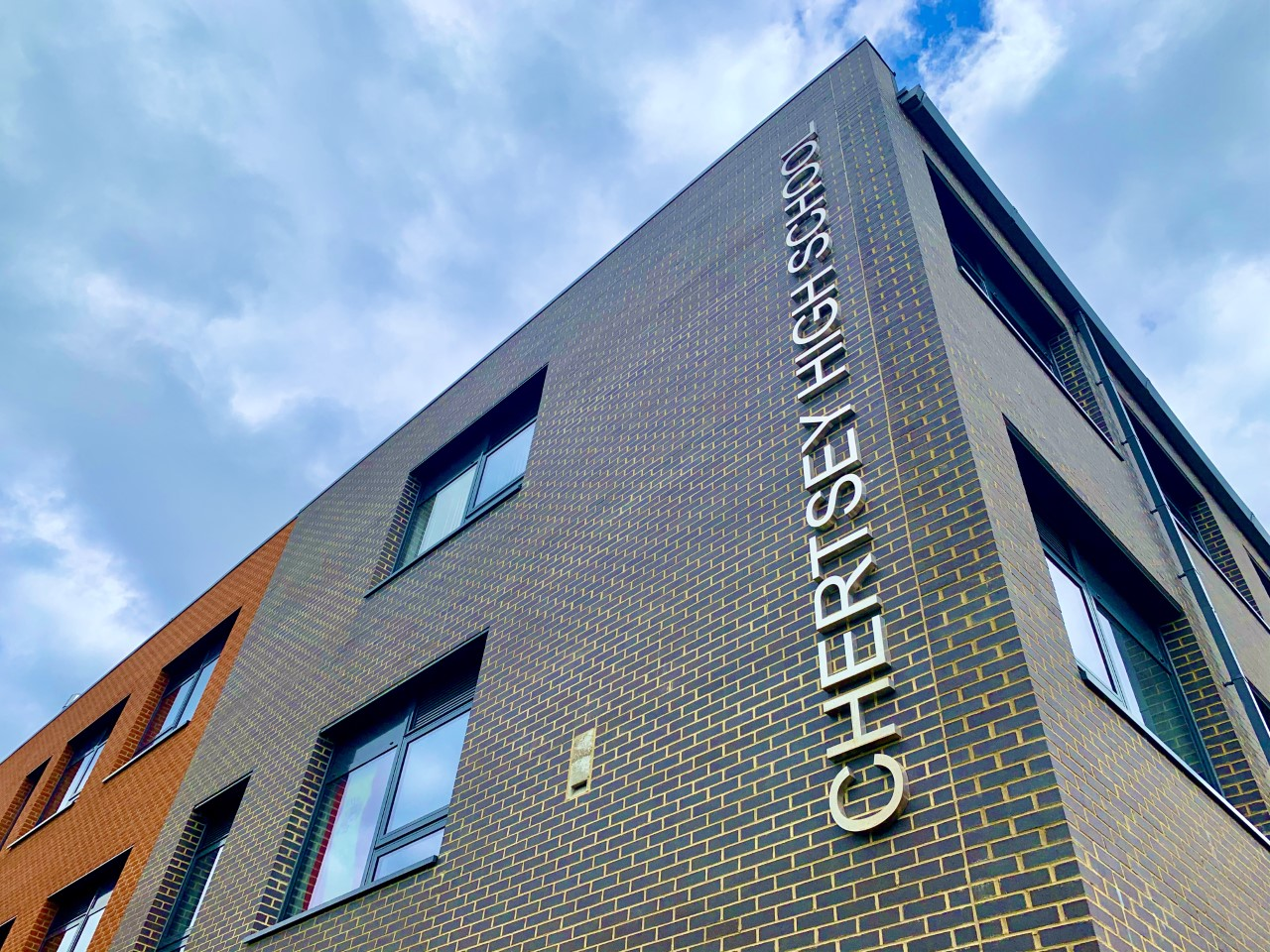
Chertsey High School

Chertsey High School is a non-faith school which welcomes children from different faiths and non-faith backgrounds, whilst maintaining strong Christian principles; the school ethos is Knowledge, Determination and Love. It opened in 2017 using the buildings that remained from the original Meads School, built in 1965. During a two-year occupancy, a new school building was developed alongside, opposite Clay Corner on the Chertsey Road. In 2019, the new school building opened its doors to 450 students, and has the capacity for 900 students over the coming years. The school has developed state-of-the-art facilities, including a 3G sports pitch, which it shares with its neighbours, Abbey Rangers Football Club.

=== Salesian School ===
The Salesian School is a state-funded, voluntary-aided Catholic comprehensive school with endowments for 1,200 pupils, located in Chertsey since the 1920s.

== Governance ==
Chertsey is located in the Borough of Runnymede and Weybridge. It was represented in Parliament by former Conservative MP Philip Hammond from 1997 until his resignation in 2019. It is currently represented by Conservative MP Ben Spencer.

The town is divided into two wards for the purpose of Borough Council elections – Riverside (Cllr Derek Cotty, Cllr Stephen Dennett, Cllr Shannon Saise-Marshall) and West (Cllr Dolsie Clarke, Cllr Mark Nuti, Cllr Myles Willingale). The town is represented on Surrey County Council by Cllr Mark Nuti.

=== Borough councillors ===
Italics indicate a by-election

Election	Chertsey Riverside (Chertsey Meads 1976-2019)			Chertsey St. Ann's		
1976	Ray Lowther (Lab)	W. Collett (Con)	D. Wyke (Con)	G. Light (Lab)	D. Hughes (Lab)	R. Palmer (Lab)
1978	Ray Lowther (Lab)	W. Collett (Con)	J. Ambrose (Con)	G. Light (Lab)	D. Hughes (Lab)	F. Bleach (Lab)
1979	Ray Lowther (Lab)	G. Paris (Con)	J. Ambrose (Con)	G. Light (Lab)	D. Hughes (Lab)	F. Bleach (Lab)
1980	Ray Lowther (Lab)	G. Paris (Con)	J. Ambrose (Con)	Joy Capper (Lab)	D. Hughes (Lab)	F. Bleach (Lab)
1982	Ray Lowther (Lab)	G. Paris (Con)	P. Jones (Con)	Joy Capper (Lab)	D. Hughes (Lab)	R. Palmer (Lab)
1983	Ray Lowther (Lab)	G. Paris (Con)	P. Jones (Con)	Joy Capper (Lab)	Chris Norman (Con)	R. Palmer (Lab)
1984	Ray Lowther (Lab)	G. Paris (Con)	P. Jones (Con)	E. Palmer (Lab)	Chris Norman (Con)	R. Palmer (Lab)
1986	Ray Lowther (Lab)	M. Hall (Con)	P. Jones (Con)	A. Gould (Lab)	Chris Norman (Con)	M. Daniel (Lab)
1987	Ray Lowther (Lab)	M. Hall (Con)	P. Jones (Con)	A. Gould (Lab)	Chris Norman (Con)	M. Daniel (Lab)
1988	Ray Lowther (Lab)	M. Hall (Con)	P. Jones (Con)	A. Gould (Lab)	Chris Norman (Con)	M. Daniel (Lab)
1990	Ray Lowther (Lab)	M. Hall (Con)	P. Jones (Con)	A. Gould (Lab)	Chris Norman (Con)	David Williams (Lab)
1991	Ray Lowther (Lab)	M. Hall (Con)	P. Jones (Con)	A. Gould (Lab)	Peter Anderson (Lab)	David Williams (Lab)
1992	Ray Lowther (Lab)	M. Hall (Con)	P. Jones (Con)	S. Avery (Con)	Peter Anderson (Lab)	David Williams (Lab)
1994	Ray Lowther (Lab)	Christopher Lovibond (Lab)	P. Jones (Con)	S. Avery (Con)	Peter Anderson (Lab)	David Williams (Lab)
1995	Ray Lowther (Lab)	Christopher Lovibond (Lab)	Chris Norman (Con)	S. Avery (Con)	Peter Anderson (Lab)	David Williams (Lab)
1996	Victor Barker (Con)	Christopher Lovibond (Lab)	Chris Norman (Con)	Steven Jenkins (Lab)	Peter Anderson (Lab)	David Williams (Lab)
1998	Victor Barker (Con)	Sarah Jacobs (Con)	Chris Norman (Con)	Steven Jenkins (Lab)	Peter Anderson (Lab)	Mary Lowther (Lab)
1999	Victor Barker (Con)	Sarah Jacobs (Con)	Chris Norman (Con)	Steven Jenkins (Lab)	Peter Anderson (Lab)	Mary Lowther (Lab)
2000	Edwin Pattington (Con)	Sarah Jacobs (Con)	Chris Norman (Con)	Judith Norman (Con)	Victor Barker (Con)	Dolsie Clarke (Con)
2002	Paul Tuley (Con)	Sarah Jacobs (Con)	Chris Norman (Con)	Judith Norman (Con)	Victor Barker (Con)	Paul Greenwood (Lab)
2003	Paul Tuley (Con)	Sarah Jacobs (Con)	Chris Norman (Con)	Judith Norman (Con)	Dolsie Clarke (Con)	Paul Greenwood (Lab)
2004	Paul Tuley (Con)	Sarah Jacobs (Con)	Chris Norman (Con)	Judith Norman (Con)	Dolsie Clarke (Con)	Paul Greenwood (Lab)
2006	Paul Tuley (Con)	Sarah Jacobs (Con)	Chris Norman (Con)	Judith Norman (Con)	Dolsie Clarke (Con)	Dick Edis (Con)
2007	Paul Tuley (Con)	Derek Cotty (Con)	Chris Norman (Con)	Judith Norman (Con)	Dolsie Clarke (Con)	Dick Edis (Con)
2008	Paul Tuley (Con)	Derek Cotty (Con)	Chris Norman (Con)	Christopher Chapman (Con)	Louis Pouyanne (Con)	Dick Edis (Con)
2010	Paul Tuley (Con)	Derek Cotty (Con)	Chris Norman (Con)	Christopher Chapman (Con)	Louis Pouyanne (Con)	Dick Edis (Con)
2011	Paul Tuley (Con)	Derek Cotty (Con)	Chris Norman (Con)	Christopher Chapman (Con)	Dolsie Clarke (Con)	Dick Edis (Con)
2012	Paul Tuley (Con)	Derek Cotty (Con)	Diana Cotty (Con)	Shannon Saise-Marshall (Con)	Dolsie Clarke (Con)	Dick Edis (Con)
October 2012	Paul Tuley (Con)	Derek Cotty (Con)	Peter Boast (Con)	Shannon Saise-Marshall (Con)	Dolsie Clarke (Con)	Dick Edis (Con)
March 2014	Paul Tuley (Con)	Derek Cotty (Con)	Mark Nuti (Con)	Shannon Saise-Marshall (Con)	Dolsie Clarke (Con)	Dick Edis (Con)
2014	Paul Tuley (Con)	Derek Cotty (Con)	Mark Nuti (Con)	Shannon Saise-Marshall (Con)	Dolsie Clarke (Con)	Dick Edis (Con)
2015	Paul Tuley (Con)	Derek Cotty (Con)	Mark Nuti (Con)	Shannon Saise-Marshall (Con)	Dolsie Clarke (Con)	Dick Edis (Con)
2016	Paul Tuley (Con)	Derek Cotty (Con)	Mark Nuti (Con)	Myles Willingale (Con)	Dolsie Clarke (Con)	Dick Edis (Con)
2018	Stephen Dennett (Con)	Derek Cotty (Con)	Mark Nuti (Con)	Myles Willingale (Con)	Dolsie Clarke (Con)	Dick Edis (Con)
2019	Stephen Dennett (Con)	Derek Cotty (Con)	Dolsie Clarke (Con)	Myles Willingale (Con)	Mark Nuti (Con)	Dick Edis (Con)
2021	Stephen Dennett (Con)	Derek Cotty (Con)	Dolsie Clarke (Con)	Myles Willingale (Con)	Mark Nuti (Con)	Dick Edis (Con)
2022	Stephen Dennett (Con)	Derek Cotty (Con)	Shannon Saise-Marshall (Con)	Myles Willingale (Con)	Mark Nuti (Con)	Dolsie Clarke (Con)
2023	Stephen Dennett (Con)	Jaz Mavi (Con)	Shannon Saise-Marshall (Con)	Myles Willingale (Con)	Mark Nuti (Con)	Dolsie Clarke (Con)
2024	Cai Parry (Lab)	Jaz Mavi (Con)	Shannon Saise-Marshall (Con)	Mark Williams (Lab)	Mark Nuti (Con)	Dolsie Clarke (Con)

=== County councillor ===
Election	Member	Party
1973	T. Reddy	Labour
1977	N. Payne	Conservative
1985	Ray Lowther	Labour
2009	Chris Norman	Conservative
2017	Mark Nuti	Conservative

== Religion ==
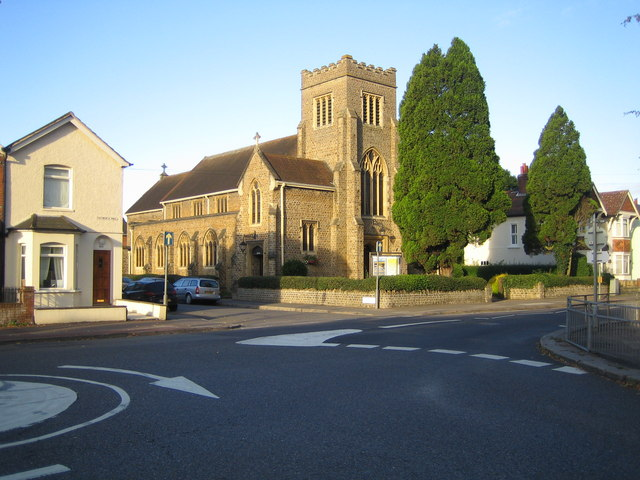
Roman Catholic Church

- St. Anne's Church is a Catholic church in Eastworth road. St. Anne's School is a Catholic Primary school in Free Prae road. Salesian School is a Catholic Secondary school and Sixth Form College located in Guildford Road and Highfield Road respectively.
- St. Peter's is a town-centre Anglican church with a range of ministries. Sunday worship is held at 9 am (traditional) and 10.30 am (contemporary).
- Beacon Church is a community church based on Guildford Street in central Chertsey.
- The International Community Church of Surrey, a non-denominational, international congregation, meets at Chertsey Hall each week.
- Equippers Church is based at the Hub near Chertsey High School and meets each Sunday and in homes during the week.

== Transport ==
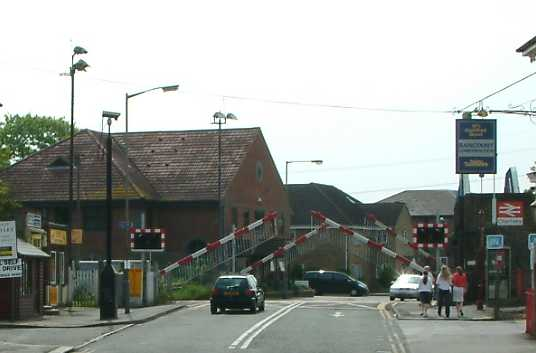
The level crossing at Chertsey

Rail

Chertsey station is on the Chertsey branch line linking the Waterloo to Reading Line to the South West Main Line in Weybridge, all three currently operated by South Western Railway, benefiting from a level crossing and a road bridge sweeping north–south traffic around to the west of the town centre. Weybridge railway station is timetabled as 11 minutes away and the journey time to London Waterloo varies between 50 minutes to 66 minutes depending on choice of route. (Note: To achieve the shortest time a non-delayed change of trains taking four minutes is required by for instance changing at Weybridge from the train scheduled to arrive at 08:07, the 08:11 can be caught to London Waterloo giving a total time of 50 minutes)

Road

The A320 is a mixed dual and single carriageway road connecting Woking to Staines-upon-Thames via Chertsey which is 3 miles (5 km) south of Staines Bridge. Scenic Chertsey Bridge was built in the 18th century, see above, this links to Shepperton. Chertsey is close to J11 of the M25 to two sides of the town (one exit bordering Ottershaw) and gives its name to the intersection of a main SSW motorway, the M3 with the M25 London Orbital Motorway.

== In fiction and popular culture ==
=== Literary connections ===
- Shakespeare's Richard III, Act I, Scene 2, mentions Chertsey as the burial place of Henry VI (Lady Anne: "Come now towards Chertsey with your holy load.")
- Abraham Cowley, the 17th-century poet, lived in Chertsey after his return from exile. Abraham Cowley Mental Health Unit at St Peter's Hospital was named after him.
- After the death of the father of Thomas Love Peacock, the future novelist and his mother lived with her father, Thomas Love, in Gogmoor Hall for about twelve years.
- Charles Dickens while writing Oliver Twist (1838), visited Chertsey, where Twist is forced by Bill Sikes to take part in an attempted burglary.
- Edward Lear makes reference to Chertsey in A Book of Nonsense:

There was an Old Lady of Chertsey,
Who made a remarkable curtsey;

She twirled round and round,
Till she sunk underground,

Which distressed all the people of Chertsey.

- Albert Smith, born in Chertsey in 1816, wrote the play Blanche Heriot, or The Chertsey Curfew (1842) and the short story "Blanche Heriot: A Legend of Old Chertsey Church" (1843).
- John Maddison Morton was living in Chertsey when he wrote Box and Cox (1847), which The New York Times in 1891 called "the best farce of the nineteenth century". It was the basis for F. C. Burnand's libretto for Arthur Sullivan's one-act comic opera Cox and Box (1866).
- The poem "Curfew Must Not Ring Tonight", written in 1867 by the American Rose Hartwick Thorpe, was also based on the legend of Blanche Heriot.
- H. G. Wells's novel The War of the Worlds has Chertsey destroyed by Martian fighting-machines in the afternoon.
- Antony Trew, naval officer and author of 17 novels and a volume of stories, died in Chertsey in 1996.
- Jerome K. Jerome, in his "Three men in a boat", writes: "Harris and I would go down in the morning, and take the boat up to Chertsey, and George... would meet us there".

=== Television and film ===
- The final series of the TV series Public Eye (1965–1975) was filmed in and around Chertsey.
- The TV series Moving Wallpaper (2008–2009) was filmed and set in Chertsey.
- Chertsey made a fleeting appearance in the 1964 classic film First Men in the Moon with the Old Town Hall standing in for Dymchurch Town Hall.
- Other films partly shot in or around Chertsey include The Italian Job (1969), Scream and Scream Again (1970), The Dark Knight (2008) and One Chance (2013).
- Portions of the music video for the Oasis song "Don't Go Away" were filmed in Chertsey in August 1997.

=== Chertsey Panto ===
The Chertsey Panto has been performed since 2012 in aid of local charities. Originally staged at the Crown public house in Chertsey, it is now performed annually at the 1st Chertsey Scouts hall in early January.

=== Radio Wey ===
Radio Wey is a hospital radio station, based at St. Peter's Hospital in Chertsey, which also broadcasts to the local community. The station has been running since 1965, originally at Weybridge Hospital and then transferred to studios in the grounds of St. Peter's Hospital in 1979.

=== Gallery Studios ===
The 1983 album Music for Piano and Drums by Patrick Moraz and Bill Bruford was recorded at Gallery Studios, engineered by Barry Radman and assisted by Trevor Smith.

== Notable residents ==
- Richard Steere (c. 1643–1721) colonial American poet and merchant – born in Chertsey.
- Peter Cunningham (c. 1747–1805) political poet and cleric – died in Chertsey.
- John Narrien (1782–1860) astronomer and author – born in Chertsey.
- Charles Cooper Henderson (1803–1877) painter – born at Abbey House, Chertsey.
- Sir Walter Hughes (1803-1887) pastoralist and philanthropist who retired to Chertsey.
- Albert Richard Smith (1816–1860) author, entertainer and mountaineer – born in Chertsey.
- Ethel Mary Boyce (1863–1936), English composer, pianist and teacher, born and lived in Chertsey.
- Charlie Llewellyn (1876–1964) the first non-white South African Test cricketer – died in Chertsey.
- James Ottaway (1908–1999) actor – born in Chertsey.
- Leslie Lewis (1924–1986) Olympic track and field athlete – born in Chertsey.
- Keith Moon (1946–1978) drummer with the rock band the Who – lived at "Tara" on St Ann's Hill from 1971 to 1975.
- Mike Rutherford (b. 1950) guitarist and co-founder of the band Genesis – born in Chertsey.
- Sir Ian Khama (b. 1953) President of Botswana 2008–2018 – born in Chertsey.
- Vince Clarke (b. 1960) keyboardist of pop bands Yazoo, Depeche Mode and Erasure – lived in Chertsey from 1990 to 2003 and recorded much of the Erasure material in the studio adjacent to his home.
- Sean Lock (1963–2021) comedian – born in Chertsey.
- Chesney Hawkes (b. 1971) singer and songwriter – lived in Chertsey.
- Ashley Giles (b. 1973) England cricketer – born in Chertsey.
- Will Jacks (b. 1998) England cricketer – born in Chertsey.
- Richard Johnson (b. 1974) England cricketer – born in Chertsey.
- Tim Brabants (b. 1977) Olympic sprint kayaker – born in Chertsey.
- Robert Green (b. 1980) goalkeeper – was born in Chertsey.
- Jimmy Chauveau (b. 1989) singer and songwriter – born in Chertsey.
- Harvey Elliott (b. 2003) Liverpool F.C. football player – born in Chertsey.

== See also ==
- Hardwick Court Farm, Chertsey, its former main manor.
- Military Vehicles and Engineering Establishment (Later Defence Logistics Organisation (DLO) Chertsey. Defunct as of 2005.)
- Chobham armour

== Bibliography ==
- Brayley, Edward Wedlake; Britton, John (1841). A topographical history of Surrey. Vol. II. Dorking: Robert Best Ede.
- Brown, James D.; Stratton, Stephen S. (1897). British Musical Biography. OCLC 680173508.
- Dewey, Henry; Bromehead, C. E. N. (1915). The Geology of the Country around Windsor and Chertsey. London: British Geological Survey. Archived from the original on 6 September 2021.
- Gover, J.E.B; Mawer, A.; Stenton, F.M. (1969). The place-names of Surrey. Cambridge: Cambridge University Press.
- Hugman, Barry J., ed. (2010). The PFA Footballers' Who's Who 2010–11. Edinburgh: Mainstream Publishing. ISBN 978-1-84596-601-0.
- Mills, A.D. (2003). Oxford Dictionary of British Place Names. Oxford: Oxford University Press. ISBN 978-0-19-852758-9.
- Rutherford, Mike (2014). The Living Years. London: Constable. ISBN 978-1-47-210981-1.
- Wharton, Donald P. (1979). Richard Steere : Colonial merchant poet. Pennsylvania State University Press. ISBN 978-0-27-100207-1.
