= Robert William Honner =

- Born: Robert William Honner; 18 January 1809; London, England
- Died: 31 December 1852 (aged 43); London, England
- Occupations: Actor, theatre manager
- Spouse: Maria Honner

Robert William Honner (18 January 1809 – 31 December 1852) was an English actor and theatre manager.

== Early and personal life ==
Honner was the youngest son of John Honner, solicitor, of the firm of Fletcher & Honner, of the parish of St. Anne, Soho, who died in 1817. He was educated at a private school at Pentonville, where Joseph Samuel Grimaldi, the son of the Clown actor Joseph Grimaldi, and Thomas Hamblin were his schoolfellows.

His father gave up his profession to become proprietor of the Heathcock Tavern, Heathcock Court, close to the Sans Pareil Theatre (now the Adelphi) in the Strand. There Honner found opportunities for indulging his taste for theatricals. His father soon died, leaving his mother unprovided for.

His wife was Maria Honner, whom he married 21 May 1836.

He died at Nichols Square, Hackney Road, London, on 31 December 1852. In the registration of his death he is called Robert Walter Honner. He was buried at West Norwood Cemetery.

== Career ==
In 1817 Honner was articled for a period of three years to Charles Leclercq the ballet-master, and shortly after appeared for his master's benefit at the Sans Pareil Theatre in a ballet called The Crown of Roses. In 1820 he went as a dancer with Mr. Kinloch to the Pantheon Theatre, Edinburgh; but the speculation was a failure, and he was left destitute. He visited the southern and western parts of England, then joined the corps de ballet at the Coburg Theatre, London, and in 1824 went to the Surrey Theatre. In 1825 Honner was again at the Coburg, and soon afterwards joined Andrew Ducrow, with whom he remained a long period, although he still went provincial tours, during which he played every character from leading business to harlequin, clown, and pantaloon.

He acted subsequently at Sadler's Wells under Joseph Grimaldi (1827); at the Surrey first with Robert William Elliston, and then with Charles Elliston and D. W. Osbaldiston, and at the Old City Theatre in Milton Street under Benjamin Webster in 1829. At later dates he returned to the Coburg; was one of Davidge's company at Liverpool, was stage-manager for George Almar at Sadler's Wells (1833), and was lessee of Sadler's Wells, as well as acting-manager for Davidge at the Surrey, from 1835 to 1838. He also often appeared at the latter house at short notice for John Reeve, Thomas Potter Cooke, and others who happened to be indisposed.

As lessee of Sadler's Wells from 1838 to 1840 he tried to establish a taste for the legitimate drama. For Mrs. Davidge he managed the Surrey from 1842 to 1846, and after a short lease of the City of London Theatre in Norton Folgate he joined John Douglass as stage-manager of the Standard Theatre, where he remained till his death. He was a good actor, his chief rôles being Richmond, Laertes, Fag in The Jew, Scrooge the Miser in A Christmas Carol, and Jemmy Twitcher in the Golden Farmer.

== Sources ==
- McConnell Stott, Andrew (2009). The Pantomime Life of Joseph Grimaldi. Edinburgh: Canongate Books. ISBN 978-1-84767-761-7.
