= Maria Honner =

Irish actress

Maria Honner (1812–1870), was an Irish actress.

== Biography and career ==
Honner, born at Enniskillen, Ireland, 21 Dec. 1812, was a daughter of Eugene Macarthy, actor and manager, who died in the Dramatic College at Maybury, Surrey, 14 May 1866, aged 78. Educated at Cork, she lost her mother at an early age, and being thrown on her own resources, with a younger brother to support, made a first appearance on the stage at a theatre in the south of Ireland. She afterwards played in Dublin, and as the hero of juvenile tragedy attracted the notice of Edmund Kean and William Charles Macready. Her first important character was Rosalie Somers in Thomas Morton's Town and Country, which she played to Edmund Kean. An engagement in Scotland followed, and she became a popular favourite. In 1831 she was engaged by John Farrell for the Pavilion Theatre, London, where for two seasons she was the leading attraction. In 1833 she transferred her services to the Coburg Theatre, and, on the retirement of G. B. Davidge the lessee, removed to Sadler's Wells, where Robert William Honner was the manager.

After the successful termination of two seasons she went to the Surrey Theatre. In June 1835 she played with exceptional success Julia in the ‘Hunchback’ at Drury Lane for the benefit of ‘Jerry-Sneak Russell.’ On 21 May 1836 she married Honner.

She continued acting with her husband at the Surrey until Whitsuntide 1838, when he became lessee of Sadler's Wells, where they played together for about five years with much success. At the request of Davidge she returned to the Surrey, where she remained until 17 Sept. 1845, and then went to the City of London Theatre. She was a good actress in pathetic roles, and after the retirement of Elizabeth Yates was for a time without a rival. She was excellent in many Shakespearean parts, as well as in Mary in 'Paul the Pilot,' Susan in 'Kohal Cave,' Felix in the 'French Revolution,' Blanche in 'Blanche Heriot,' and Clemency in Charles Dickens's 'The Battle of Life.' She died of paralysis at the residence of her second husband, Frederick Morton, stage-manager of Charing Cross Theatre, on 4 Jan. 1870.
