= Albert Richard Smith =

English writer and mountaineer (1816– 1860)

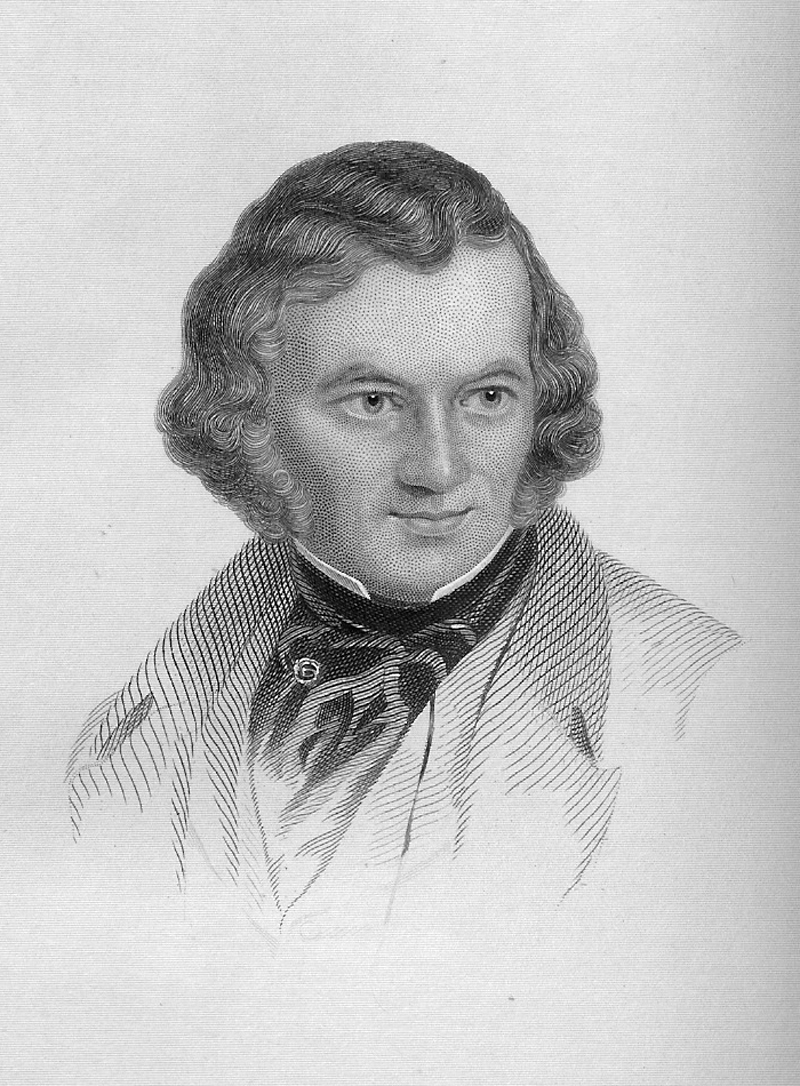
- Albert Smith engraving from 1858
- Born: 24 May 1816; Chertsey, Surrey, England
- Died: 23 May 1860 (aged 43); Fulham, London, England
- Resting place: Brompton Cemetery; 51°29′0″N 0°11′21″W
- Occupations: Author, entertainer, mountaineer
- Spouse: Mary Lucy Keeley (m. 1859)

Albert Richard Smith (24 May 1816 – 23 May 1860) was an English physician, author, entertainer, and mountaineer.

== Biography ==
=== Literary career ===
Smith was born at Chertsey, Surrey. The son of a surgeon, he studied medicine in London and in Paris, and his first literary effort was an account of his life in Paris, which appeared in the Mirror. He gradually abandoned his medical work in favour of writing. Though a journalist rather than a literary figure, he was one of the most popular writers of his time, and a favourite humorist. He was one of the early contributors to Punch 1842, and was also a regular contributor to Richard Bentley's Miscellany, in whose pages his first and best book, the novel The Adventures of Mr Ledbury, appeared in 1842. His other novels were The Fortunes of the Scattergood Family (1845), The Marchioness of Brinvilliers: The Poisoner of the Seventeenth Century (1846), The Struggles and Adventures of Christopher Tadpole (1848), and The Pottleton Legacy: A Story of Town and Country (1849). He also published a novella, The Adventures of Jack Holiday, with Something about His Sister (1844).

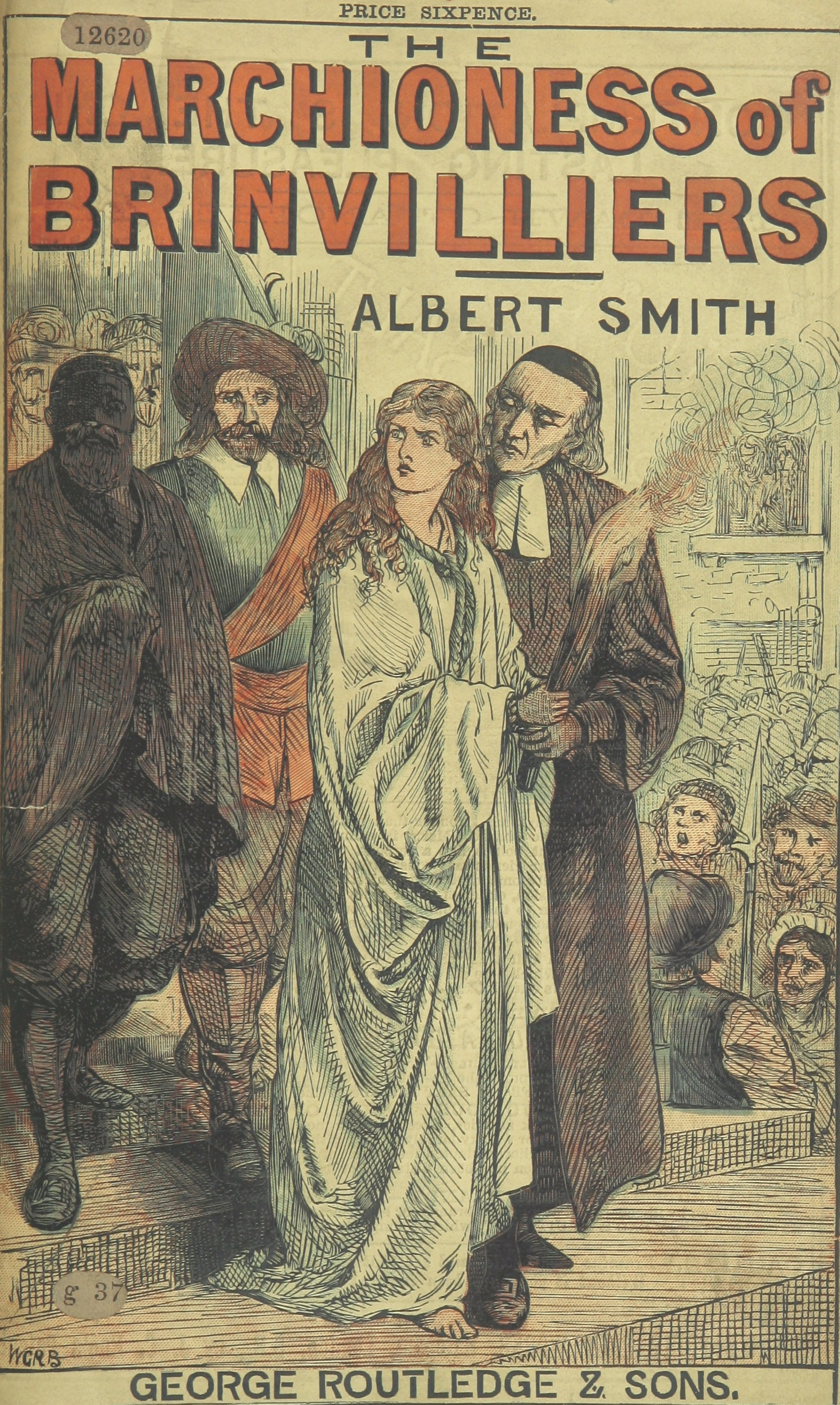
The Marchioness of Brinvilliers: The Poisoner of the Seventeenth Century, 1846 novel (1887 edition)

In 1842 Smith's first play, Blanche Heriot, or The Chertsey Curfew, was produced at the Surrey Theatre. In 1843 he published The Wassail-Bowl: A Comic Christmas Sketchbook, which included a short story on the same subject as his play of the year before, "Blanche Heriot: A Legend of Old Chertsey Church". He also wrote a series of so-called natural histories: The Gent (1847), The Ballet Girl (1847), 'Stuck-Up' People (1847), The Idler upon Town (1848) and The Flirt (1848). Smith wrote several extravaganzas for the Lyceum Theatre, including Aladdin (1844), Valentine and Orson (1844) and Whittington and His Cat (1845), and adapted for the same theatre Charles Dickens's The Cricket on the Hearth (1845) and The Battle of Life (1846). With Angus Bethune Reach he founded and edited a monthly magazine called The Man in the Moon, which ran from January 1847 to June 1849.

=== Travels and mountaineering ===
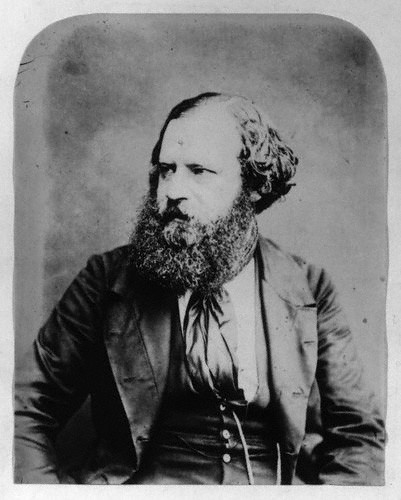
Albert Richard Smith in the 1850s.

In 1849 Smith went on a tour to Constantinople and the Near East. On his return he published A Month at Constantinople, and shortly afterwards he appeared at Willis's Rooms in a public entertainment about his travels called "The Overland Mail", which proved a hit. He mentioned of the city "I had never been so strongly moved before but once - when I looked down upon London, by night, from a balloon". In August 1851 he ascended Mont Blanc. The year after he published a book about his adventures, The Story of Mont Blanc, and produced at the Egyptian Hall an entertainment called "Mont Blanc", describing the ascent of the mountain and the Englishman abroad, which became the most popular exhibition of the kind ever known. In May 1854 he gave his performance before Queen Victoria and Prince Albert at Osborne House. Smith's "Mont Blanc" show ran for 2000 performances over six years and helped to popularize mountain climbing in mid-Victorian Britain. He was one of the founder members of the Alpine Club in 1857. In July 1858 Smith traveled to Hong Kong. On his return he published To China and Back (1859), and in December 1858 he commenced at the Egyptian Hall a third entertainment, called "Mont Blanc to China", which was also very popular.

In 2019, the QC Terme wellness centre opened a sauna named after Albert Smith as a tribute to his work in inspiring people to visit Chamonix.

=== Family ===
In 1859 Smith married Mary Lucy Keeley (circa 1830–1870), who had been an actress and was the elder daughter of the comedian Robert Keeley and the distinguished actress Mary Anne Keeley. In 1860 he died from bronchitis in Fulham, London, and was buried in Brompton Cemetery. Smith received great help from his brother, Arthur W.W. Smith (1825–1861), who had also been educated in medicine and who managed the entertainments at the Egyptian Hall from 1852 to 1860. Arthur also planned Charles Dickens's readings in 1858, and made arrangements for a second series, but died before they were completed.
