= Reginald Shirley Brooks =

English journalist

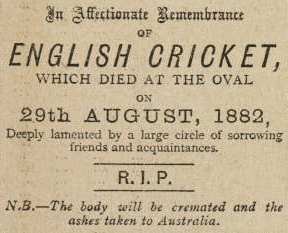
The death notice that appeared in The Sporting Times

Reginald Shirley Walkinshaw Brooks (October 1854 – 10 May 1888) was an English journalist whose spoof obituary of English cricket gave rise to the legend of The Ashes.

== Life and career ==
Brooks was born in Pancras, London, the elder son of Shirley Brooks, the satirical writer and editor of Punch, and Emily Walkinshaw Brooks.

Brooks' father died in 1874; Reginald Shirley Brooks collated some of his father's satirical writing for Punch about a pompous middle-class couple called The Naggletons into book form and it was published the following year. A further volume of his father's epigrammatic verses was published under the title of Wit and Humour and reviewed in 1884.

Brooks became a writer and journalist himself, joining The Sporting Times no later than 1876. He wrote under the pen-name "Peter Blobbs"; the newspaper, known as the "Pink Un", covered sports in general but particularly horse-racing, and also dealt in society gossip. In 1880 he was announced as the launch editor for The Sketch, a weekly magazine of society news, though the launch did not then happen.

From 1880 to 1884 he wrote for Punch. According to a history of the magazine published in 1895: "He wrote some smart papers, but his groove was not that of the sober and respectable Fleet Street Sage. He preferred wilder spirits, and he accordingly retired, taking with him the sympathy of his companions."

It was while writing for The Sporting Times in 1882 that Brooks published a spoof obituary of English cricket, following the England side's defeat in a Test match against Australia. His mild satire resulted in subsequent cricket series between Australia and England becoming known as "The Ashes".

According to Mike Selvey, besides the chance to be amusing Brooks had a more serious motive in writing his "obituary". At the time, cremation was still unlawful. Brooks' father had been a member of the Cremation Society of Great Britain, which was campaigning to have it made legal. When his father died in 1874, Brooks was unable to have him cremated as he would have wished. However, eight years later he was able to give publicity to the cause through what he wrote. A reference work on cremation states: "Cremation was the butt of many, usually very unwitty, jokes, and the obituary was at least as much a joke about cremation as about English cricket."

Brooks – and the Sporting Times as a whole – had in any case a reputation as something of a joker. A story retold in a book of 1898 by one of the other journalists of Brooks' time recounts an incident when the newspaper was three columns short at the time of going to press "and nobody was sober enough to attempt the task of writing them"; Brooks solved the problem by reprinting an entire article from the magazine Truth, merely adding the headline: "How on Earth Did this Story get into the Columns of Truth?" Following the publication of the memoirs of the theatrical impresario John Hollingshead in 1895, another journalist recounted an incident in which he and Brooks had successfully conned theatre tickets from Hollingshead. Some of Brooks' witticisms misfired. In 1886, the French actor/manager Marius was in charge of the Empire Theatre, which was owned by the Café Royal, and reacted badly when Brooks, in a review of a play at the Empire for a magazine called The Bat, suggested the Café Royal might have done better to employ Marius in his former profession of a waiter, rather than as a theatre manager. Marius claimed never to have been a waiter and sued for libel; Brooks took to the witness stand but the case was lost and Marius received £100 damages.

Brooks' lifestyle meant that he was not a "morning person". According to a servant at the hotel in Covent Garden where he was a long-term resident, when asked what time he had breakfast: "Breakfast! He don't trouble no breakfast, but he's gener'ly sick about har' past eleven or a quarter to twelve!"

In his novel Summer Lightning, first published in 1929, P. G. Wodehouse invented a dissolute past for the character Galahad Threepwood, in the course of which Brooks is mentioned. In his younger days Galahad had been "a brother-in-arms of the Shifter, the Pitcher, Peter Blobbs and the rest of an interesting but not strait-laced circle".

Less than six years after his spoof obituary for English cricket was published, Brooks himself had died in London at the early age of 33. Like his father before him, he was buried at Kensal Green Cemetery. He had been suffering from tuberculosis and rheumatism, which had latterly prevented him from working. Obituaries said that his byline on the Sporting Times of Peter Blobbs was known all over the world, and in spite of his having led a Bohemian lifestyle, "Few men could get through more work in less time, and its quality was invariably good." An obituary in the society magazine Vanity Fair (reprinted in the Sheffield Evening Telegraph) wrote that he had inherited "much of the literary ability of his father" and was "endowed with a keen and very original sense of humour that was entirely his own". Simon Briggs summed him up less charitably as "a stereotypical boozy hack who chased actresses, gambled recklessly and drank himself to an early grave". According to a colleague on the Sporting Times: "Shirley had a sweet and gentle disposition that caused him to be beloved by everybody, nor did any of the petty ironies of life disturb him in the least." Ten years after his death, his former room when visiting the country residence that belonged to John Corlett, the paper's proprietor and editor, was still preserved as he had left it, with his photographs, pictures and sketches adorning the walls.
