= Jabez Hogg =

English surgeon and photographer

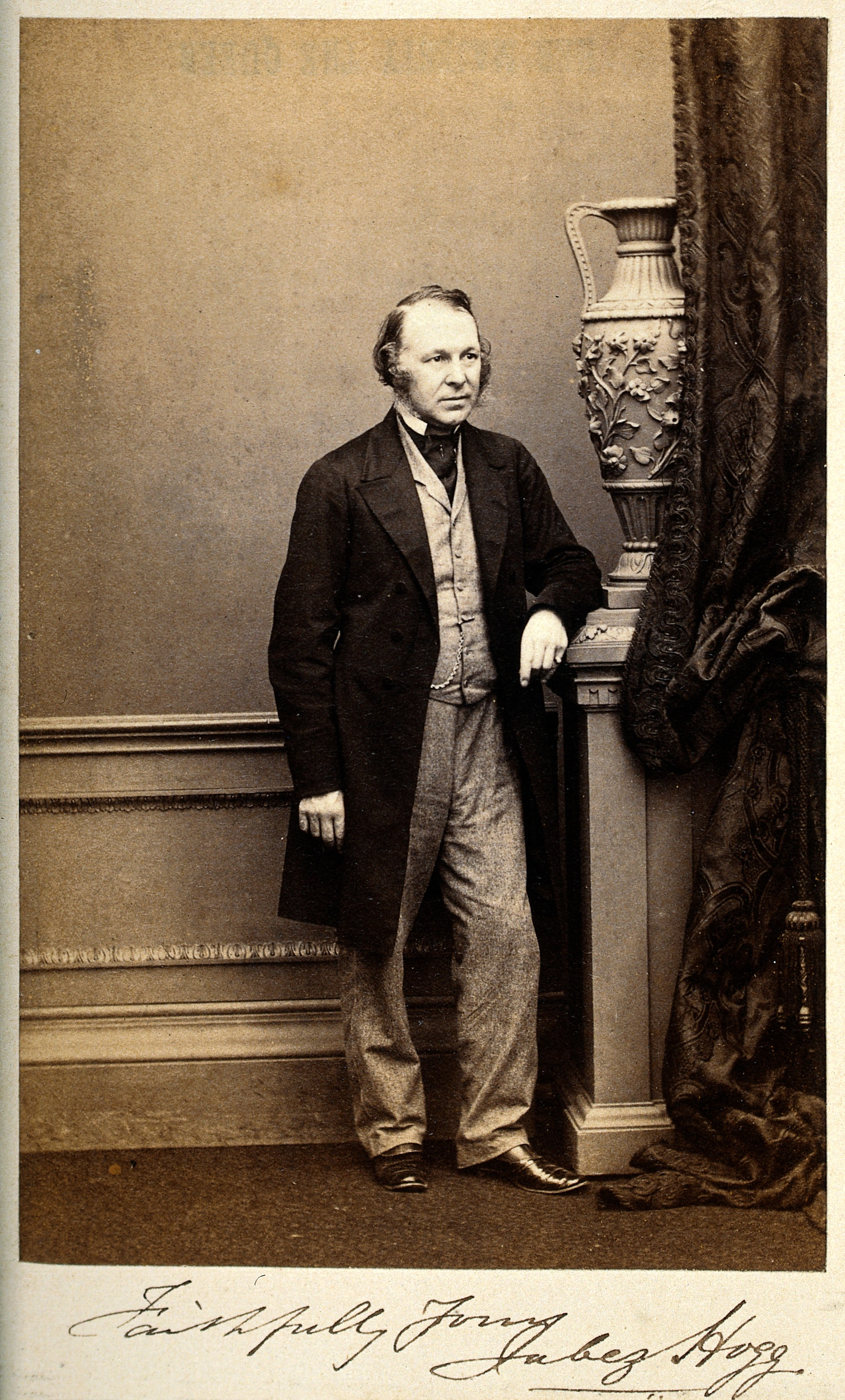
- Born: 4 April 1817
- Died: 22 April 1899 (aged 82)
- Occupations: Surgeon and photographer

Jabez Hogg (4 April 1817 – 23 April 1899) was an English ophthalmic surgeon and early photographer. A 1843 daguerreotype of him taking someone's photo is the earliest known photo of a photographer at work.

== Biography ==
Hogg was the youngest son of James Hogg and Martha, his wife, was born at Chatham, where his father was employed in the royal dockyard, on 4 April 1817. He was educated at Rochester Grammar School, and in 1832 was apprenticed for five years to a medical practitioner. In 1843, he published a 'Manual of Photography,' which brought him to the notice of the proprietors of the 'Illustrated London News.' He joined the staff of this periodical, and from 1850 to 1866 he acted as editor of a series of illustrated educational works published byHerbert Ingram. In 1846 he was sub-editor of the 'Illuminated Magazine,' to which Hablot K. Browne and John Leech both contributed, and he edited the 'Illustrated London Almanack' for fifty-one years.

Hogg entered as a student at the Hunterian School of Medicine and at Charing Cross Hospital in 1845, though he was not admitted a member of the Royal College of Surgeons of England until 1850. By the advice of George James Guthrie, he devoted himself more particularly to the study of diseases of the eye, and he soon became proficient in the use of the ophthalmoscope, then newly introduced. On 1 February 1855, he was appointed at the Royal Westminster Ophthalmic Hospital as personal assistant to Guthrie, the founder of the hospital, and here he was elected to the office of surgeon on 2 February 1871, a position he resigned under an age limit on 7 June 1877. He was also an ophthalmic surgeon at the Hospital for Women and Children in the Waterloo Bridge Road and to the masonic charities.

He was a vice-president of the Medical Society of London in 1851–2, and was elected a fellow of the Linnean Society in 1866. He served as honorary secretary of the Royal Microscopical Society from 1867 to 1872, and he was first president of the Medical Microscopical Society. He was a prominent freemason, both in the craft and arch degrees. He died on 23 April 1899 and is buried in Kensal Green cemetery. He married, in 1841, Mary Ann, a daughter of Captain Davis of the Indian navy, and in 1859 the youngest daughter of Captain James Read.

Hogg's works were:

- 'The Domestic Medical and Surgical Guide, ... to which is appended Advice on the Preservation of Health at Sea,' London, 1803, 8vo; 5th edit. 1860.
- 'Elements of Experimental and Natural Philosophy,' London, 1853, 8vo; new edit. 1861; also issued in Bonn's 'Scientific Library.'
- 'The Microscope, its History, Construction, and Applications,' London, 1854, 8vo; 10th edit. 1898.
- 'A Practical Manual of Photography,' 5th edit. London, 18~>6, 12mo.
- 'The Ophthalmoscope, its Mode of Application explained,' London, 1858; 2nd edit. 1858.
- 'A Manual of Ophthalmoscopic Surgery,' 3rd edit. London, 1863, 8vo.
- 'Cataract and its Treatment, Medical and Surgical,' London, 1869, 8vo.
- 'Skin Diseases,' London, 1873, 8vo; 2nd edit., under the title 'A Parasitic or Germ Theory of Disease,' London, 1873, 8vo.
- 'Impairment and Loss of Vision from Spinal Concussion,' London, 1876, 8vo.
- 'The Cure of Cataract and other Eye Affections,' London, 8vo; 1878, 12mo; 3rd edit. London, 1882, 8vo.

He also edited the 'Journal of British Ophthalmology,' 1864, 8vo.
