= NER Class R1 =

1908/1909 built British Class of 4-4-0 Locomotives (1908-1846)

NER Class R1 LNER Class D21
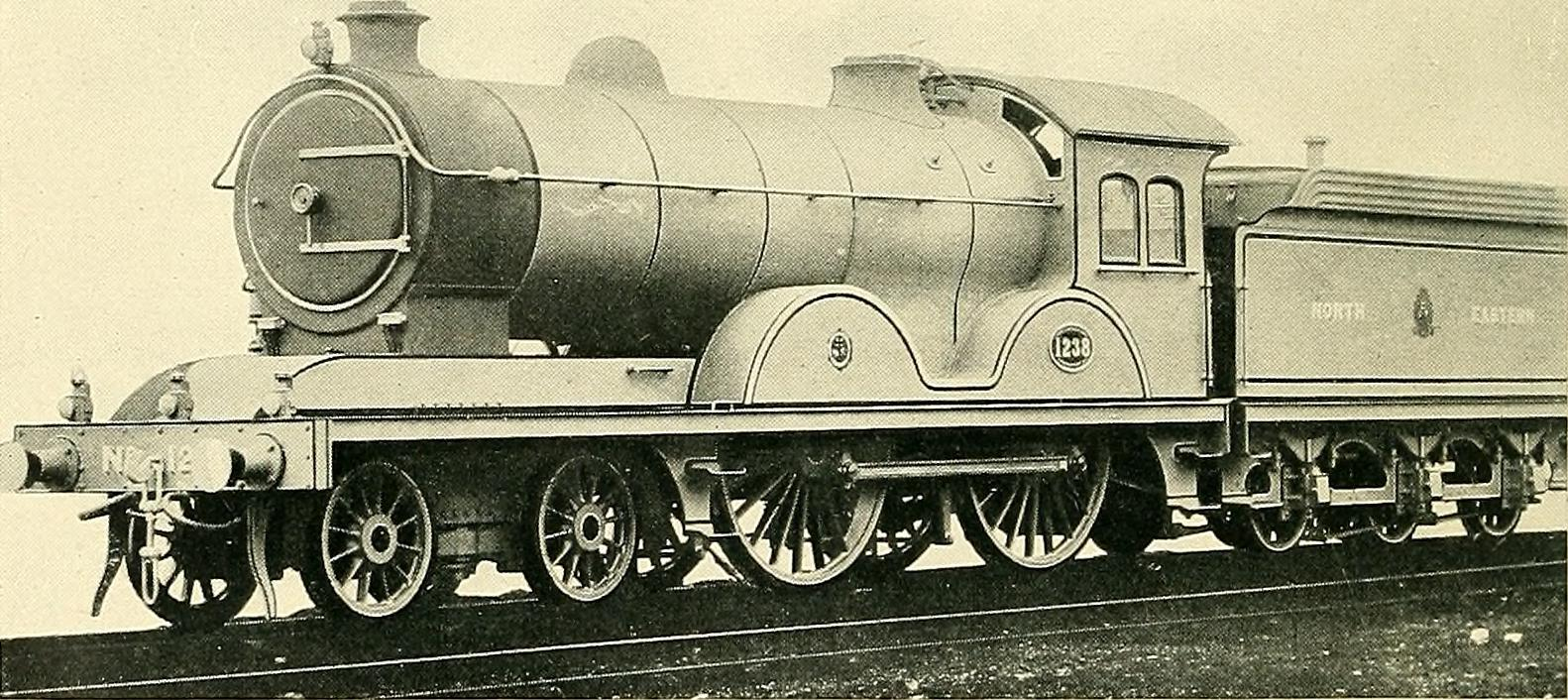
Type and origin
- Power type: Steam
- Designer: Wilson Worsdell
- Builder: NER Gateshead works
- Build date: 1908-1909
- Total produced: 10
Specifications
- Configuration
  - Whyte: 4-4-0
- Gauge: 4 ft 8 1/2 in (1,435 mm)
- Leading dia.: 3 ft 7 1/4 in (1.099 m)
- Driver dia.: 6 ft 10 in (2.08 m)
- Wheelbase: 23 ft 9 in (7.24 m) engine 12 ft 8 in (3.86 m) tender 45 ft 10 3/4 in (13.989 m) total
- Axle load: 20.8 long tons (21.1 t)
- Fuel type: coal
- Boiler: 5 ft 6 in (1.68 m) diameter
- Boiler pressure: 175 psi (1.21 MPa)
- Cylinders: two inside
- Cylinder size: 19 in × 26 in (480 mm × 660 mm)
- Valve gear: Stephenson
Performance figures
- Tractive effort: 17,026 lbf (75.74 kN)
Career
- Operators: North Eastern Railway; London and North Eastern Railway
- Retired: 1942-1946
- Disposition: All scrapped

The NER Class R1 (LNER Class D21) was a class of 4-4-0 steam locomotives of the North Eastern Railway. The class was designed by Wilson Worsdell and built from 1908 to 1909.

== Design ==
The design was similar to that of the NER Class R (LNER Class D20) but a larger boiler was used. Boiler pressure was initially 225 psi (1.55 MPa).

Towards the end of construction the work was to be moved from Gateshead to Darlington Works. However the initial locomotive assembled as Darlington was failed as unfit to drive and subsequent investigations established that the coupling rod centres were not equal, resulting in a change of Works Manager at Darlington.

== Modifications ==
Boiler pressure was reduced to 180 psi (1.24 MPa) at an unknown date. Superheaters were fitted between 1912 and 1915 and, at the same time, boiler pressure was further reduced to 160 psi (1.1 MPa). It was standard NER practice to reduce boiler pressure when fitting a superheater. At some time before the 1923 Grouping, boiler pressure was increased to 175 psi (1.21 MPa).

== Use ==
The R1s were initially used on the Glasgow-Newcastle and York-Newcastle services. However, as loads increased, they were replaced by more powerful locomotive types (like the class Z) and relegated to secondary duties. By 1924, the Gresley A1s started to arrived in large numbers, which displaced the C7s to many of the secondary duties of the D21s, and in particular, York its entire allocation.

== Withdrawal ==
They were withdrawn between 1942 and 1946 and none were preserved.
