= Southport and Ormskirk Hospital NHS Trust =

- Type: NHS hospital trust
- Hospitals: Southport and Formby District General Hospital; Ormskirk District General Hospital
- Chair: Neil Masom
- Chief executive: Ann Marr
- Staff: 3,013

Southport and Ormskirk Hospital NHS Trust was the principal healthcare provider to 258,000 people across Southport, Formby and West Lancashire.

== Services ==
The Trust provided care at Southport and Formby District General Hospital and Ormskirk District General Hospital.

The Trust is the home of the North West Regional Spinal Injuries Centre which provides care for spinal patients from across the North West, North Wales and the Isle of Man. The centre provides treatment of people who require permanent mechanical ventilation following spinal cord injury.

In 2020/21, 2.094 babies were born at the maternity unit at Ormskirk hospital.

Sefton Sexual Health provides services from clinics in Bootle and across the borough of Sefton.

A specialist Wheelchair Service for patients registered with GPs in Chorley and South Ribble operates from Pimbo, near Skelmersdale.

== Performance ==
The Trust was rated "requires improvement" following an inspection by the Care Quality Commission in November 2019. However, following an unannounced inspection in March 2021, the CQC found significant improvement across all the areas they reviewed. They also noted staff spoke positively about the culture in the hospital and the support and visibility of the leadership teams on the medical wards.

From 20 September 2021, the Trust entered an agreement for a long-term partnership with the neighbouring St Helens and Knowsley Teaching Hospitals NHS Trust with Ann Marr as chief executive and Anne-Marie Stretch as managing director, Trish Armstrong-Child having become chief executive of Blackpool Teachings Hospitals NHS Foundation Trust.

== Honorary Freedom of the Borough ==
On 26 January 2023, the Southport and Ormskirk Hospital NHS Trust was granted the Honorary Freedom of the Metropolitan Borough of Sefton.

== History ==
In 1948 there were seven hospitals in Southport: Southport General Infirmary, the Promenade Hospital, Greaves Hall Hospital, Fleetwood Road Hospital, New Hall Hospital run by Ramsay Health Care UK and, for maternity services, St Katherine's and the Christiana Hartley unit.

The present organisation was formed from the merger of acute hospital services in Southport and Ormskirk in 1999.

Chief executive Jonathan Parry, Chief Operating Officer Sheilah Finnegan, and Sharon Partington, Director of Human Resources, were all excluded from work in August 2015 after complaints by whistleblowers relating to a "serious employment issue". Partington subsequently resigned. Parry was dismissed and Finnegan was cleared but retired.

On 1 July 2023, the Trust merged with St Helens and Knowsley Teaching Hospitals NHS Trust to form Mersey and West Lancashire Teaching Hospitals NHS Trust.
