= Southport Hospital =

Southport Hospital may refer to:

In Southport, Merseyside, England

- Southport and Formby District General Hospital
- Southport General Infirmary
- Southport Promenade Hospital

In Southport, Queensland, Australia

- Gold Coast Hospital
- Gold Coast Private Hospital
- Gold Coast University Hospital

In Southport, North Carolina, United States

- Dosher Memorial Hospital
