= St Helens Hospital =

St Helens Hospital may refer to:

== United Kingdom ==
- St Helens Hospital, Merseyside
- St Helen's Hospital, Clatterbridge Cancer Centre
- St Helen's Hospital, now St Mary's Hospital, Kettering
- St Helens and Knowsley Teaching Hospitals
- St Helen's Isolation Hospital, Isles of Scilly
- St Helen's Rehabilitation Hospital, York

== Australia ==
- St Helen's Hospital (Brisbane), now Wesley Hospital (Brisbane)

== New Zealand ==
- St Helens Hospitals, New Zealand
