= Christiana Hartley =

British philanthropist and politician (1872–1948)

Christiana Hartley CBE (1872 – 14 December 1948) was an English social and welfare rights activist, philanthropist and Liberal Party politician.

== Family and education ==
Christiana Hartley was born at Colne in Lancashire in 1872, the daughter of Sir William Pickles Hartley, the manufacturer and philanthropist who founded the Hartley's jam company and Margaret O’Connor Horsfield. She was educated at home by governesses and at private schools. The Hartley family were Primitive Methodists and their philanthropy and approach to social affairs was governed by their religious principles. Christiana was actively involved with the Church Street, Methodist Church in Colne. She never married.

== Career ==
Christiana was associated with the family jam and marmalade business, being sometime chairman and a Director of the company.

== Politics ==
Following her Methodist beliefs, Christiana started her religious and social campaigning in 1907 in Southport, where her family home was situated. She served as a Poor Law guardian on the Ormskirk Board of Guardians for 18 years. In 1920, she became a member of Southport Town Council, a County borough, and served until 1932. In 1921–22, she was elected the first woman Mayor of Southport, causing what has been described as ‘trepidation’ among the male councilors. During her term she handed over her mayoral salary of £500 to one of the Labour members of council for a project to assist Southport's poor and arranged for this sum to be matched by her father. She made the welfare of children and young people her especial focus and was rewarded with the soubriquet of the ‘Children’s Mayor’. As part of her political apprenticeship, Hartley spent seven nights, George Orwell style, in typical lodging houses, later speaking of her experiences and bringing them to bear in her public life.

== Other public appointments ==
In 1923, Hartley was appointed a justice of the peace for Southport Borough later becoming a Lancashire county magistrate for the Formby police sub-division.

== Honours ==
Hartley was made a Freeman of Colne in 1927 and of Southport in 1940. In the birthday honours list of 1943, she was awarded a CBE for public services in Southport. Also in 1943, Hartley received an honorary MA degree from the University of Liverpool in recognition of all her philanthropic work.

== Philanthropy and welfare work ==
=== Maternity ===
Hartley served as a member of Southport's Maternity and Child Welfare sub-committee. In 1926, she opened the Liverpool maternity Hospital where John Lennon of the Beatles was born in 1940. In 1928, she proposed the construction of a fully equipped maternity hospital for the town (Southport).The plans were accepted and the Christiana Hartley Maternity Hospital opened in May 1932 on the Curzon Road side of the site. The Christiana Hartley maternity unit remained on the Infirmary site until it was moved over to the new District General Hospital in 1999. In addition, in 1940 Hartley endowed a nurses’ home in Southport.

=== Unemployment relief ===
Hartley made donations to Southport Trades Council and Labour Party for work on behalf of the unemployed.

=== Education ===
Recognising the need to help other women and the importance of education, Hartley endowed two scholarships for women at Liverpool University and two at Girton College, Cambridge. She also served as a governor at Southport's King George V School and the High School for Girls.

== Death ==
Hartley died of bronchial pneumonia at her home, 4 Lord Street West, Southport, on 14 December 1948.
