= Hartley Victoria College =

Coordinates: 53.450°N 2.253°W

Hartley Victoria College was a Methodist theological college in Manchester, England. In 1934, after the union that created the Methodist Church of Great Britain, Victoria Park merged with the nearby Hartley College to create Hartley Victoria College. It closed in 2015.

Hartley College was founded for training clergy for the Primitive Methodist ministry in 1881. In 1906 the Manchester theological college for training Primitive Methodist ministers was renamed Hartley College in recognition of the benefactions of Sir William Pickles Hartley of Hartley's jams. The original Hartley College building in Whalley Range was sold to the Northern School of Music, which later sold it to the Kassim Darwish Grammar School for Boys.

Victoria Park College opened as the training establishment of the United Methodist Free Church in 1877. After union in 1907 and closure of the Methodist New Connexion Ranmoor College in Sheffield, Victoria Park became the ministerial college of the United Methodist Church. In 1934 after the Methodist Union, Victoria Park and Hartley College merged and the Victoria Park, Manchester site was sold.
