= Radio Wey =

Coordinates: 51.3765°N 0.5288°W

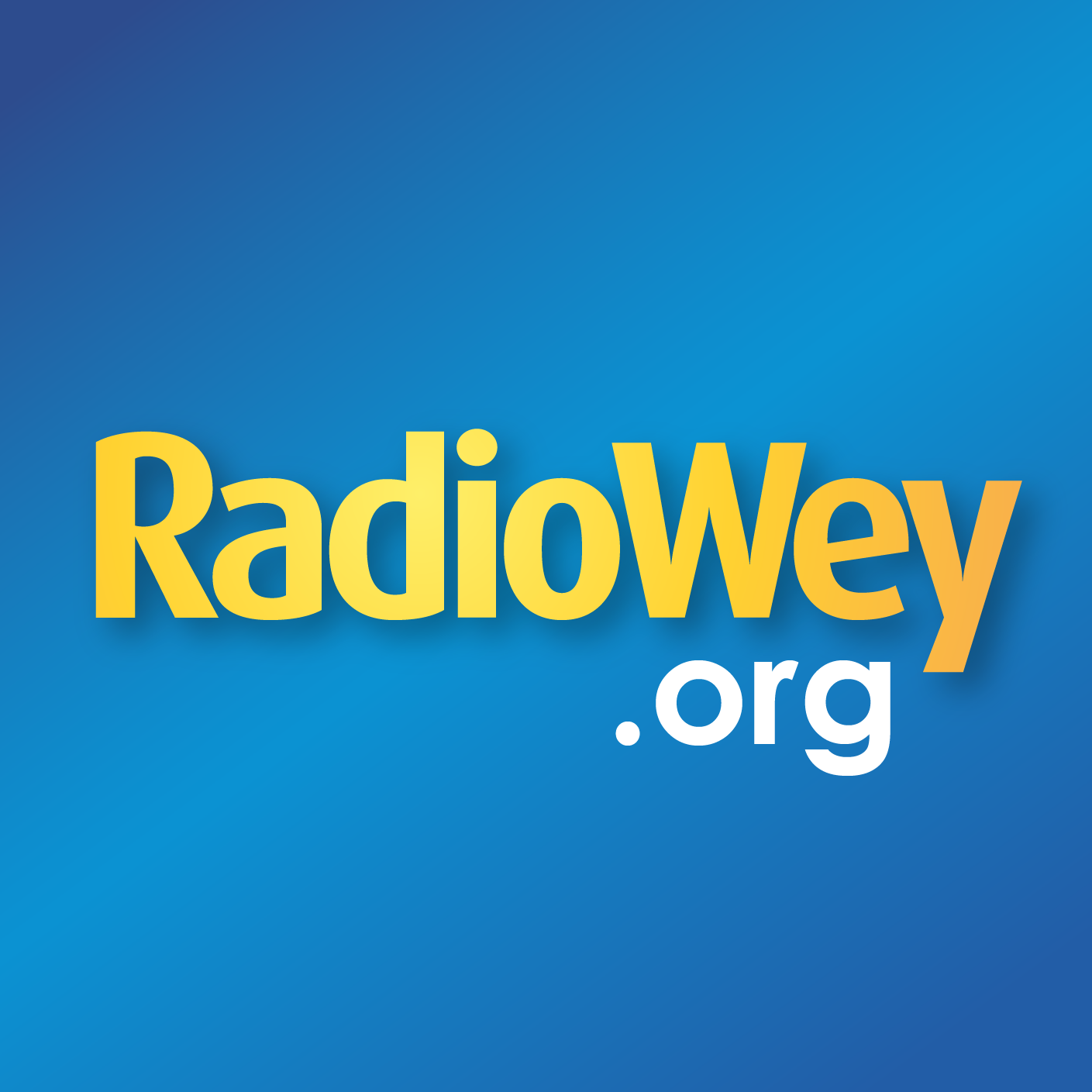
- Chertsey; England

Programming
- Format: Hospital radio

History
- First air date: 5 October 1967

Technical information

Links
- Website: http://www.radiowey.org

Radio Wey is a hospital radio station based at St Peters Hospital in Chertsey, England. It provides entertainment to the patients and staff of Ashford and St Peters Hospitals NHS Foundation Trust. The station broadcasts using WiFi speakers at St Peters Hospital and Ashford Hospital, as well as on the internet to the local community of North West Surrey and Middlesex

The station is run as a charity by volunteers (registered charity number 275620). Today Radio Wey has over 60 members, who work together, to present a range of live programmes each week. They also carry out all the roles necessary to run the station, such as administration, maintenance of the equipment, and raising the funds. As Radio Wey has no income or grant aid, it needs to raise all money it needs to run the station. This comes from member's subscriptions, donations and fundraising activities

== History ==
The origins of Hospital Radio Wey go back to the mid-1960s when two friends, Alan Timbrell and John Best spent some of their leisure time visiting patients in Weybridge Hospital and finding out what kind of music they liked. The patients’ choices of music were then recorded onto a tape recorder in Alan's home. They then returned to the hospital with the tape recorder and played the music to the patients in the wards.

Once acceptance was gained, the hospital offered a room for the production of programmes. At that time there was no ready-made equipment for a home studio, therefore it was necessary to construct equipment from kits produced for radio DIY enthusiasts.

A basic studio with an interviewer's desk and record storage was constructed which made it possible to broadcast live programmes to the wards over the patient headphone system, which were initially Bakelite headphones, later to be replaced with the plastic tube Stethoscope system. The first live broadcast was on 5 October 1967. The schedule at that time consisted of 13 hours of programmes a week, presented by three broadcasters.

The studio at Weybridge Hospital was then linked to other hospitals using (as it was then) GPO telephone lines, and eventually, broadcasts were made to Weybridge, Walton, St Peter's, Ellesmere and Ashford hospitals. There was also a link to Stompond Lane football ground, which enabled live 2nd half commentary on Walton and Hersham FC's home games. The first commentary was broadcast on 11 October 1970. At a later date the Hospital Radio Wey network was extended to Woking Victoria hospital.

By 1971 Hospital Radio Wey had grown to 23 members who were presenting 30 hours of programmes a week. Programmes consisted of patient requests, collected by a Hospital Radio Wey (HRW) member visiting the wards. Each member would visit a specific ward and the requests would then be played at a specific time each week for each ward. There were also specialist music programmes such as classical music, country and western, big band and jazz.

In the early years, most of the HRW members had day jobs and programmes were broadcast on weekday evenings and on Saturday and Sunday. BBC programmes were available for the patients during the times HRW was not broadcasting its own material.

As the network increased, more members were recruited and an increased number of wards had dedicated request programmes. Some members used their experience gained from hospital radio to secure work in professional radio, which was being deregulated. With the introduction of commercial radio and BBC local radio, there came increasing job opportunities.

Each Friday a special local news programme was compiled and broadcast. This programme was recorded and made available to another charity "Talking newspapers for the blind", who duplicated the content onto cassette tapes and distributed them to blind people in the area.

Early in 1973 the DIY studio equipment was replaced by a custom built mixing console. The re-opening on Sunday 8 April 1973 featured a day of special programmes by guest presenters from BBC and commercial radio. Those participating were Tony Brandon, Noel Edmonds, Terry Wogan, Johnnie Walker, John Dunn and Keith Skues.

One slogan used by HRW was "Bringing the outside to your bedsides." Using equipment that had to be connected by telephone line, HRW members visited events in the catchment area served by the hospitals and provided reports and interviews from those events. These included hospital fetes, shopping centres, and the Byfleet Parish Day. If no telephone link was available, recordings were made and taken back to the studio to be played on air later.

The cost of the landline links had been met by the hospital amenity fund but in 1977 the hospital announced that it could no longer pay for the links. The local press at the time picked up the story which made front page headlines. The outcome of the publicity benefitted HRW. Not only did the hospitals agree to continue to fund the transmission links, but one local councillor offered support to HRW through business connections and the Helping Hands charity. This secured the donation of a professional mixing desk, unused except for a demonstration in a marketing suite. Cash donations were also made.

The station closed for three months to install the donated broadcast desk, together with other new equipment. Once complete, there was a grand re-opening day. With many guest personalities from the radio scene of the day, the new studio provided a stable platform for HRW to present its programmes.

Another landmark came in 1978 when Hospital Radio Wey became a registered charity. Its registration number being 275620.

The studio at Weybridge had become affectionately known as "the shoebox" due to its small size and shape and it was not possible for HRW to develop it further. In 1984, HRW was offered accommodation at St Peter's Hospital and this presented an opportunity to expand beyond the cramped single room at Weybridge. The building that was offered had been the hospital's telephone exchange and it needed considerable alterations to make it suitable for use as a broadcasting studio and record library.

Plans were drawn up, and in 1985, the hospital works department appointed a contractor and supervised the building work, which cost £12,200. £5,000 of this was contributed by the hospitals, with HRW paying the remainder. HRW members undertook the decoration and fitting out at the premises, which offered space for two studios, a record library, a kitchen and a toilet. The plan was to install one brand new studio, and to be able to broadcast from the new premises so that we could transfer the existing studio kit from Weybridge to the new accommodation.

Estimates for the new studio equipment amounted to nearly £7,500 with £2,700 being needed to refit the equipment being re-used from Weybridge into the second studio. A lot of fundraising needed to be done. HRW benefitted from the fact that the supply industry had started to market equipment specifically for non-professional use and Radio Wey was able to purchase one of the first off the shelf, mixing desks specifically aimed at its needs.

With the transfer to St Peter's complete, an official opening of the new studio complex was held with guest of honour Sir Cliff Richard. They were also joined on the day by Alan Dell, Adrian Juste, Adrian Love and Tony Brandon. Shortly after the move, things were changing in the way music was marketed and the CD was introduced. New equipment needed to be added to the studios so music in this format could be played. The record library also evolved to store the CD cases.

To enhance its outside broadcast capacity, HRW invested in a new caravan. The events attended also offered fundraising opportunities. The van was fitted out specifically for Radio Wey use and gave excellent service until it was sold to another hospital radio organisation; a decision taken because so few members had cars with tow bars, needed to take it to events.

Changes in the NHS also affected HRW. With the closure of smaller hospitals, the service to Ellesmere, Walton, Woking and eventually Weybridge ceased as these hospitals closed or were given new healthcare roles. This left HRW just serving Ashford and St Peter's Hospitals.

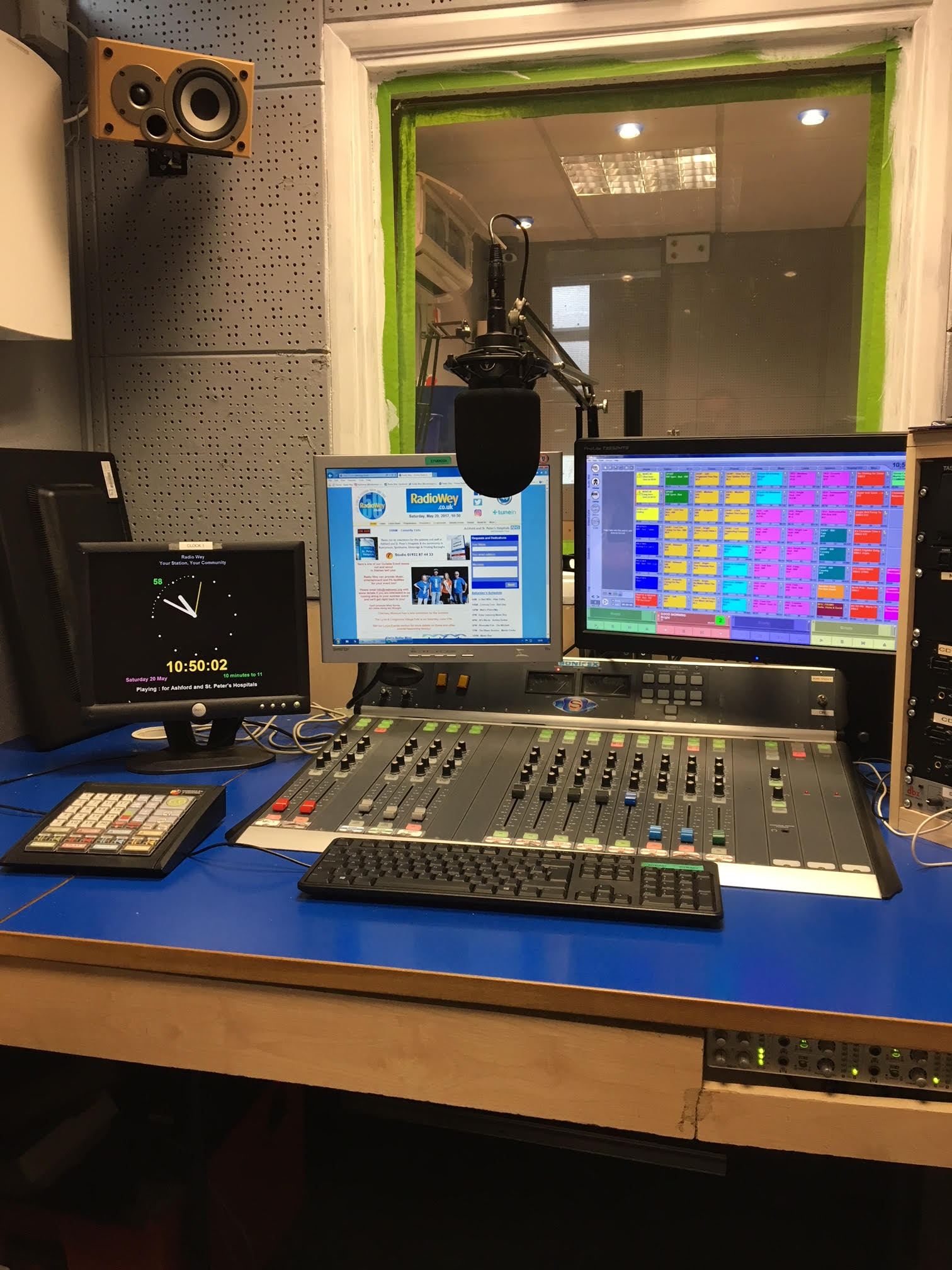
Studio 1 at Radio Wey

One of the programmes is the Sunday morning, "Good News" religious programme. The building of the new Accident & Emergency wing at St Peter's included a new chapel to replace the one on The Ramp, which was scheduled to be demolished. During the construction, permanent wiring was installed above the ceiling to enable non-intrusive microphones to be installed. Radio Wey now began to broadcast a live service from the chapel on the first Sunday of each month and this continues today.

Digital equipment for broadcast use continued to be developed. HRW adopted the use of a digital playout system known as "Myriad." Music tracks could be stored on a computer and accessed by a keyboard or screen. One advantage was the space saved in the music library which had become full of vinyl records and CD discs.

The development of Internet applications has also impacted on broadcasting. In 2007, HRW made its programmes available through its website. This made it possible for hospital staff to access the programmes and facilitated introduction of the service into nursing homes. Sports fans who were away from home also found it possible to keep in touch with the fortunes of local teams.

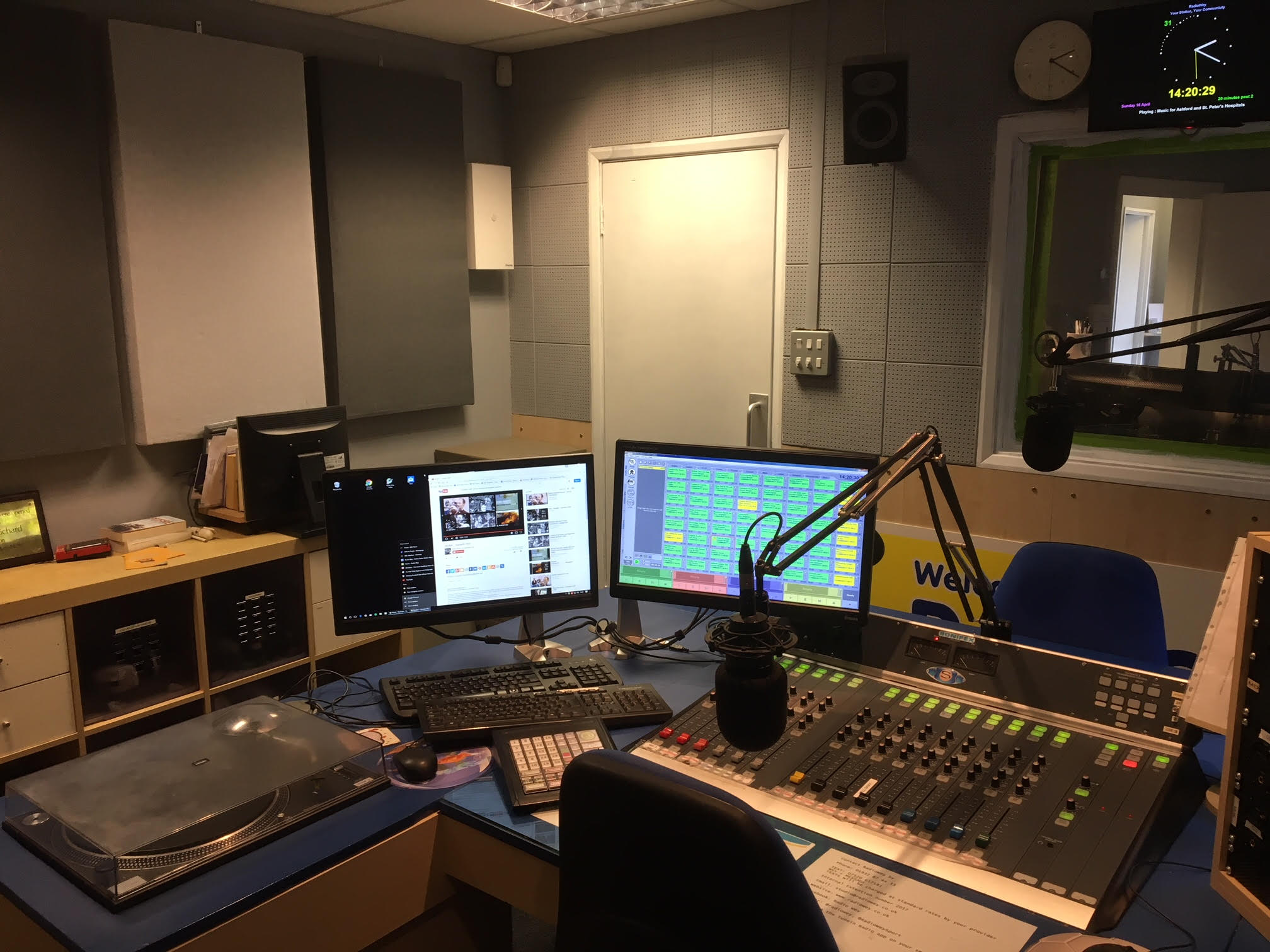
Studio 2 at Radio Wey

By around 2005, the equipment installed in the late 1980s was becoming time expired and difficult to maintain. HRW's plans at that time were to get better premises and a new studio appeal was launched. Consultation with the hospital authorities began. Plans were drawn up for a replacement studio on the same site as the existing building. Planning permission was obtained. A lottery application to cover the construction costs of £100,000 was unsuccessful and the scheme could not proceed. Other options were considered but none could be turned into a practical affordable scheme.

In 2007, a decision was taken to refit Studio 2 with programmes continuing to be broadcast from Studio 1. New studio furniture, mixing desk and other equipment was installed after redecoration. This was completed in September 2007. The new telephone connections included with the new equipment gave better facilities for the Saturday SportScene team which enabled better coverage from more grounds.

The following year, the mixer in Studio 1 which had seen service since 1978 failed and that studio was then completely refitted to the same specification as Studio 2. Having two identical studios made it easier to train new presenters.

In 2012, the volunteers at Ashford and St Peters Hospitals NHS Trust were awarded the Queen's Award for Voluntary Services and Hospital Radio Wey is part of this team

In recent years, the station have had presenters who have retired or work shifts and this has enabled us to offer daytime programming in addition to evenings and weekends.

== Programming ==
Radio Wey broadcasts 24 hours a day, 365 days a year, with over 85 hours of live programming every week. This consists of a mix of request shows [where the presenters have visited the hospital wards and collected request details from the patients and staff], specialist music programmes; news programmes; speech based shows; classic comedy and sport.

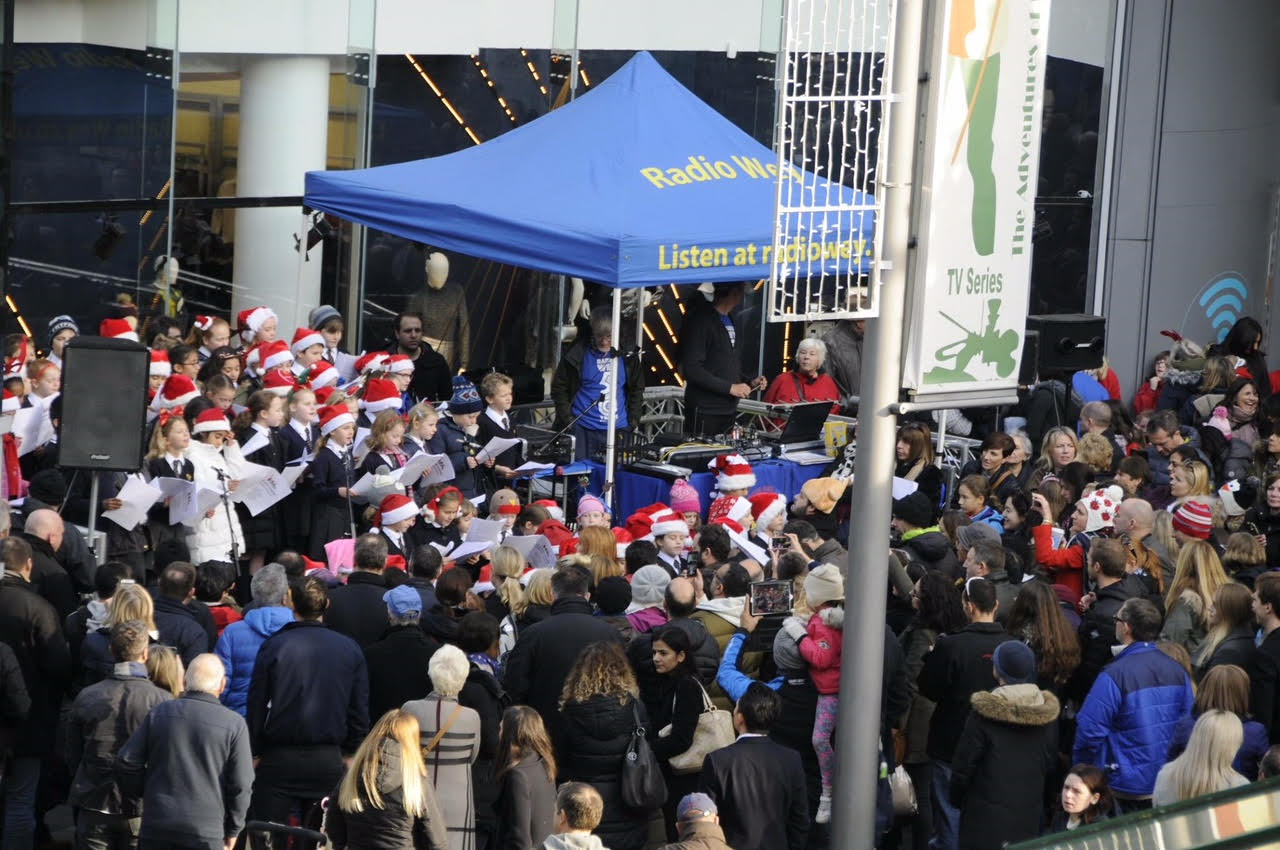
Radio Wey at the Festival of Light at Walton-on-Thames 2016

On Saturday afternoons, the SportScene team provides commentary on a local football match as well as reports from other local football and rugby matches. Some of the regular teams covered are Staines Town FC, Hampton & Richmond Borough FC, Woking FC, Dorking Wanderers FC, Bracknell Town FC, and Esher Rugby

The station also works with the community at local events, providing public address, music and entertainment services. Recent events include the Black Cherry Fair and Goose Fair in Chertsey, the Pancake Race, Santa Fun Run and Christmas Parade in Staines upon Thames, Horsell Village Show, Ottershaw May Fair and the Heritage Day and the Festival of Light at Christmas, both in Walton on Thames.

== Awards ==
Each year, the Hospital Broadcasting Association invites its member stations to submit examples and extracts of their programmes to be judged in various categories. Radio Wey has been very successful over the years. In recent years, they have achieved the following:-

- In 2012, HRW volunteer Noel Antliff won off air volunteer of the Year.
- In 2013, the station won a Gold award for Best Station Promotion, Gold for Best Male Presenter [Andy Brown] and a Silver award for Best Female Presenter [Mandy Morrow].
- In 2014, the station won a Gold award for Best Station Promotion, and Silver awards for Best Female Presenter [Gail Hutson] and Best Specialist Music Programme [MiTunes with Steve Chambers]
- In 2015, a Silver award for Best Female Presenter [Mandy Morrow]
- Also in 2015 Jim Coombe was awarded the Lifetime Achievement Award at the Eagle Radio Community Awards for his services and commitment to Radio Wey for over forty eight years.
- In 2016, Peter Harman received the Lifetime Achievement Award at the Runnymede Volunteer Awards for his time and dedication given to the station for over forty eight years.
- In 2017, a Silver award for Best Female Presenter [Mandy Morrow].
- In 2018, the station have four entries in the final; Best Female Presenter [Mandy Morrow], Best Newcomer [Judith Allford], Best Specialist Music Programme [Rob's Jazz Club with Rob Chantler] and Best Speech Package [Swan Ward Lunch Club presented by Jon Andrews] At the awards ceremony held on 24 March 2018 in Old Windsor, Mandy Morrow received the Gold Award for Best Female Presenter
- In 2020, the station have four entries shortlisted in the final of the National Hospital Radio Awards; Best Programme with Multiple Presenters [Katharine Mann and Maria Lopiano with the Young Wey], Best Station Promotion [Sam and Ed trailer for the Young Wey], Best Special Event [Coverage of the St Peters Hospital Community Open Day] and an entry for the Recognising Innovation across Hospital Radio category for the installation of wi-fi speakers in the wards. At the award ceremony which was held virtually on 13 April 2020, as the original ceremony due to be held in Bolton at the end of March was cancelled due to the Covid19 lockdown which took place across the UK, we picked up four awards:- GOLD The Young Wey [Katharine Mann and Maria Lopiano] in the Best Programme with Multiple Presenters category - listen in at 3pm to 5pm on Thursdays to hear the girls SILVER · The Young Wey [Sam and Eddie version] programme trailer in the Best Station Promotion category BRONZE · The St Peters Community Open Day in the Best Special Event category And also we picked up the Recognising Innovation across Hospital Radio category for our entry, for “Introducing the Wi-Fi speakers into our hospitals”
- In 2021, the station had one entry shortlisted at the National Hospital Radio Awards; Best Specialist Music Programme [ Helen's Classical Journey with Helen Julia Minors]
- In 2022, the station had one entry shortlisted at the National Hospital Radio Awards, Best Station Promotion [Keep Hydrated message - one of six we broadcast during National Hydration Week in 2021]
- in 2025, the station won SILVER at the National Hospital Radio Awards 2025 in the Station Promotion category with their entry "Help Me, I'm in a Cupboard"
- In 2026, the station was awarded a Highly Commended Award at the Runnymede Civic Awards in the Service to the Community - Organisation category. They were nominated for this award by Ashford and St Peters Hospitals NHS Foundation Trust in appreciation of the support they provide their Trust and also to celebrate the 60th Anniversary of Radio Wey
- in 2026, at the National Hospital Radio Awards, the station picked up three awards, Maria Lopiano received a SILVER award in the Best Female Presenter category, in the Station Promotion category we gained a BRONZE award and the station also received the Recognising Innovation across Hospital Radio for their in house developed mobile application [app] and a bespoke in house audio recognition service

== See also ==
- Ashford and St Peters Hospitals NHS Foundation Trust
- Hospital Broadcasting Association
