= Ashford and St Peter's Hospitals NHS Foundation Trust =

- Type: NHS Foundation Trust
- Established: 1 December 2010
- Hospitals: St Peter's Hospital, Chertsey; Ashford Hospital
- Chair: Caroline Warner
- Chief executive: Katie Fisher (interim)
- Website: www.ashfordstpeters.nhs.uk

Ashford and St Peter's Hospitals NHS Foundation Trust is a medium sized district general hospital working across two sites in Surrey: St Peter's Hospital in Chertsey and Ashford Hospital in Ashford.

== History ==
Ashford Hospital was developed from the former Staines (Poor law union) Workhouse Infirmary founded under the requirement of statute for each workhouse to offer a separate infirmary (the Poor Law Amendment Act 1867). The hospital had followed the usual development of such institutions. It operated as an emergency (specialist emergency) hospital during World War II.

St Peter's is a site built after World War II on much of the former park surrounding Botleys Mansion, which remains intact, in a semi-rural part of Chertsey. The local parish church has for more than a thousand years been dedicated to Saint Peter adjoining one of England's oldest abbeys — some of foundations of the abbey in public gardens and the much-rebuilt church are two kilometres away.

Ashford Hospital & St. Peter's Hospital NHS Trusts were merged on 1 April 1998. It became a Foundation Trust in December 2010.

A plan for the Trust to take over Epsom Hospital was abandoned in October 2012 by NHS London board because a financially viable plan for the future of Epsom hospital as part of the merged trust could not be developed. In May 2014 it was reported that the Trust was proposing to merge with Royal Surrey County Hospital NHS Foundation Trust. The proposed merger was abandoned in November 2016.

== Performance ==
In October 2013 the Trust was categorised as a band six, the best rating, in a hospital intelligence monitoring report published by the Care Quality Commission.

The Trust did poorly in the 2015 cancer patient experience survey so paired up with St Helens and Knowsley Teaching Hospitals NHS Trust, which did very well, in a scheme "to spread and accelerate innovative practice via peer to peer support and learning".

Two of Ashford Hospital's wards, used by the elderly for rehabilitation care, were closed in June 2015 after a review carried out by the Clinical Commissioning Group found patients recovered better away from acute hospitals. Rehabilitation will in future be at Walton Community Hospital, Woking Hospital, nursing homes or at patients' own homes.

== See also ==
- List of NHS trusts
