= Newton Community Hospital =

- Mersey and West Lancashire Teaching Hospitals NHS Trust
- Location within Merseyside

Geography
- Location: Newton Community Hospital, Bradlegh Road, Newton-le-Willows WA12 8RB, England, United Kingdom
- Coordinates: 53.4459°N 2.6350°W

Organisation
- Care system: Public NHS
- Type: Rehabilitation

History
- Opened: September 2008

Links
- Website: sthk.merseywestlancs.nhs.uk/newton-community-hospital
- Lists: Hospitals in England

Newton Community Hospital, also known as Newton Hospital, is a sub-acute care NHS Hospital in Newton-le-willows, St Helens, England. It is managed by the Mersey and West Lancashire Teaching Hospitals NHS Trust.

== History ==
Newton Community Hospital originally opened around 1924, on an older site further down Bradlegh Road. In 2006, a planning application was submitted to allow for a development of a new building for the Newton Community Hospital, which was approved. Construction began, and the hospital opened to patients in September 2008. The old hospital site would later be used for a housing development.

== Facilities ==
The hospital features a 30-bed in patient facility, X-Ray, ultrasound and ECG provision, outpatient physiotherapy and occupational therapy, outpatient clinics, a GP practice, a cardiac rehabilitation gymnasium, a rehabilitation garden, and a pharmacy.

== Purpose ==
The hospital provides rehabilitation services to patients who are medically fit to leave acute care, but for whatever reason require more treatment to be able to help them return home or to an assisted care environment.
