= St Peter's Hospital, Chertsey =

NHS hospital

St Peter's Hospital
- Ashford and St Peter's Hospitals NHS Foundation Trust
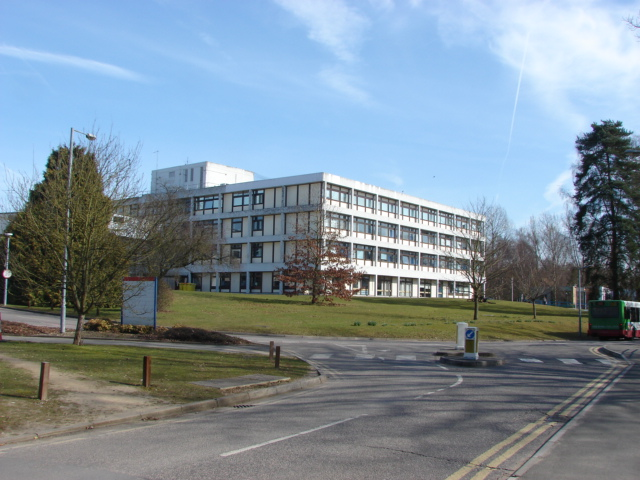
- St Peter's Hospital

- Shown in Surrey

Geography
- Location: Chertsey, Surrey, England
- Coordinates: 51°22′38″N 0°31′35″W

Organisation
- Care system: NHS England
- Type: District general
- Affiliated university: Imperial College London; St George's, University of London

Services
- Emergency department: Yes
- Beds: 550

History
- Founded: 1939

Links
- Website: http://www.ashfordstpeters.nhs.uk

St Peter's Hospital is an NHS district general hospital in Chertsey, Surrey, England. It has 400 beds and a wide range of acute care services, including an Accident & Emergency department. It is located between Woking and Chertsey near junction 11 of the M25 motorway and is managed by Ashford and St Peter's Hospitals NHS Foundation Trust.

== History ==
The hospital has its origins in an Emergency Medical Service hospital established in the grounds of Botleys Mansion in September 1939. After the war the hospital was managed by Surrey County Council as an acute general hospital until it joined the National Health Service in 1948. The hospital was redeveloped in the late 1960s with the first phase, which included five new operating theatres, being opened by the Duchess of Kent in September 1967 and the second phase, which included a maternity block, being opened in 1970. A new out-patients department was opened by Geoffrey Pattie MP in 1981 and the Abraham Cowley Unit for mental health opened in 1988.

The Duchess of Kent Wing, which included a Postgraduate Education Centre and modern well-equipped wards, was opened by the Duchess of Kent in 1992. The Prince Edward Wing, which included the accident & emergency department, the ITU and the orthopaedic unit was opened by Prince Edward in the summer of 1998. The Duchess of Kent Wing was extended to include two further wards in 2006.

In March 2022 it was announced that the 53 bed Abraham Cowley Unit, which had dormitory bedrooms and communal bathrooms, was to be demolished and replaced.

== Services ==
The hospital radio station, Radio Wey started broadcasting to patients and staff from St Peters in 1965 and today also serves an area beyond the hospital's main catchment area.

== Transport ==
St Peter's Hospital is 0.8 miles (1.3 km) SSW of Chertsey railway station and has regular bus services to a wide range of towns. Public transport between Ashford Hospital and St Peter's Hospital is available by the 446 bus route.

== See also ==
- List of hospitals in England
