= Mersey and West Lancashire Teaching Hospitals NHS Trust =

National Health Service hospital trust

- Type: NHS hospital trust
- Established: 1 July 2023
- Headquarters: Whiston Hospital
- Region served: West Lancashire, Merseyside
- Hospitals: Whiston Hospital; St Helens Hospital; Southport and Formby District General Hospital; Ormskirk District General Hospital; Newton Community Hospital
- Chair: Richard Fraser
- Chief executive: Ann Marr
- Website: www.merseywestlancs.nhs.uk

Mersey and West Lancashire Teaching Hospitals NHS Trust is an NHS trust that provides services throughout Merseyside and West Lancashire. It began operations on 1 July 2023, following the merger of Southport and Ormskirk Hospital NHS Trust and St Helens and Knowsley Teaching Hospitals NHS Trust.

== Services ==
The trust provides care services at Whiston Hospital, St Helens Hospital, Southport and Formby District General Hospital, Ormskirk District General Hospital and Newton Hospital.

The trust also houses the North West Regional Spinal Injuries Centre, which is based at Southport and Formby District General Hospital, and the Mersey Region Burns and Plastic Surgery Unit, which is based at Whiston Hospital.

The trust also operates the Sefton Sexual Health Service, which provides sexual health services and clinics across the borough of Sefton.

The trust also operates a specialist wheelchair service for patients registered with GPs in West Lancashire, South Ribble and Chorley that is based in the Pimbo Industrial Estate in Skelmersdale.

== History ==
The trust was formed on 1 July 2023, following regulatory approval of a merger between Southport and Ormskirk Hospital NHS Trust and St Helens and Knowsley Teaching Hospitals NHS Trust. The trusts had already been working in close partnership after an agreement between the two trusts was signed in September 2021, meaning that the trusts would share a chief executive.
