= Ashford Hospital =

- Ashford and St Peter's Hospitals NHS Foundation Trust
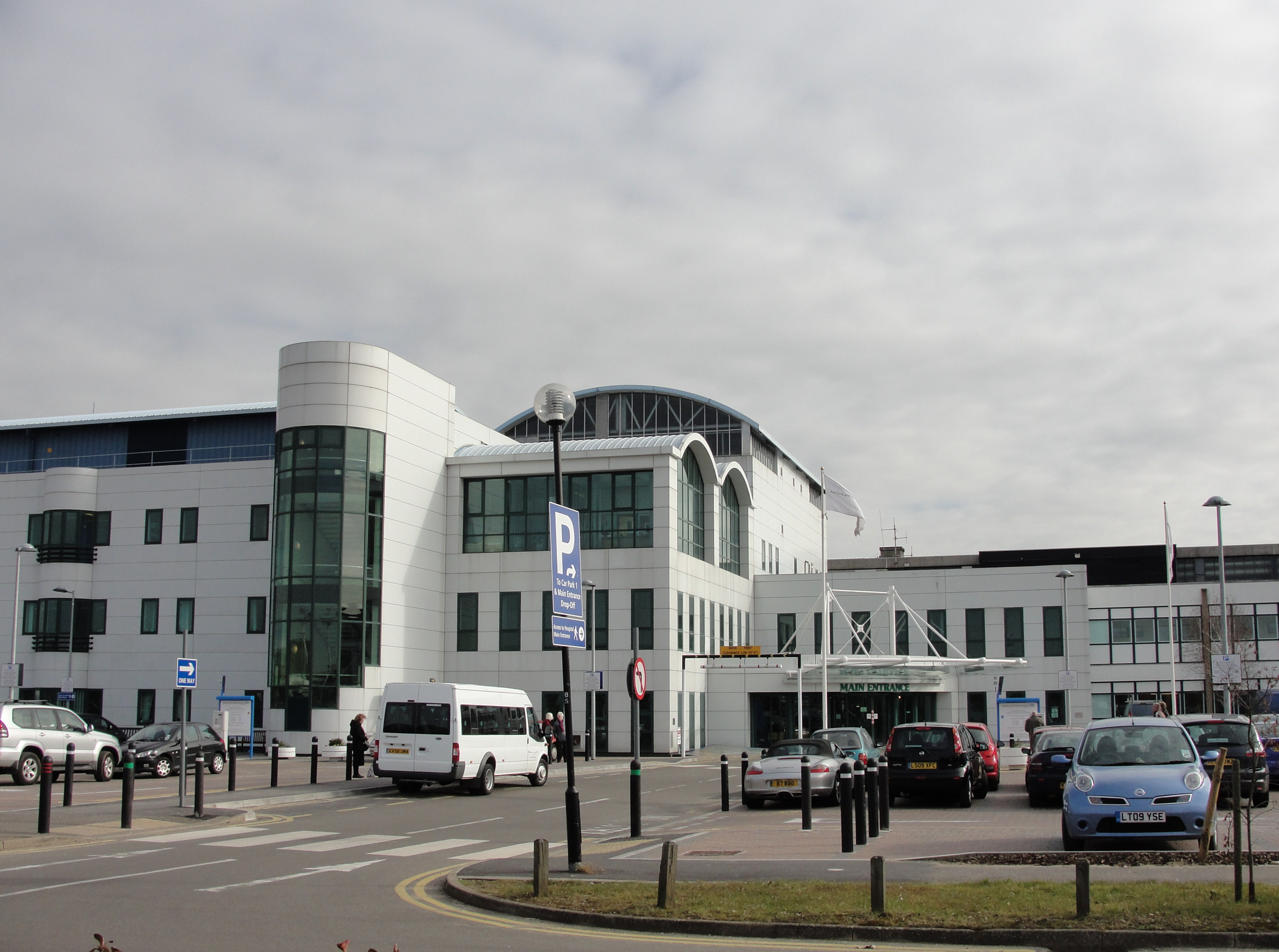
- Ashford Hospital

Geography
- Location: Ashford, Surrey, England
- Coordinates: 51.444057°N 0.472998°W

Organisation
- Care system: National Health Service
- Type: General
- Affiliated university: Imperial College School of Medicine

Links
- Website: www.ashfordstpeters.nhs.uk/about-us/about-the-trust/ashford-hospital

Ashford Hospital is a general hospital in Ashford, Surrey. It is managed by the Ashford and St Peter's Hospitals NHS Foundation Trust.

== History ==
The hospital has its origins in the Staines Poor Law Union Infirmary which opened in the mid-19th century. It became the Staines Emergency Hospital in September 1939, Staines County Hospital in December 1941 and Ashford County Hospital in June 1945. It joined the National Health Service as Ashford Hospital in 1948. A new nurses' home was completed in December 1956 and new out-patients and accident and emergency departments were added in 1966. A new maternity unit followed in 1968.

The hospital was completely redeveloped in the early 1990s and the new facilities opened in September 1995.
