= William Pickles Hartley =

English jam manufacturer and philanthropist

Sir William Hartley
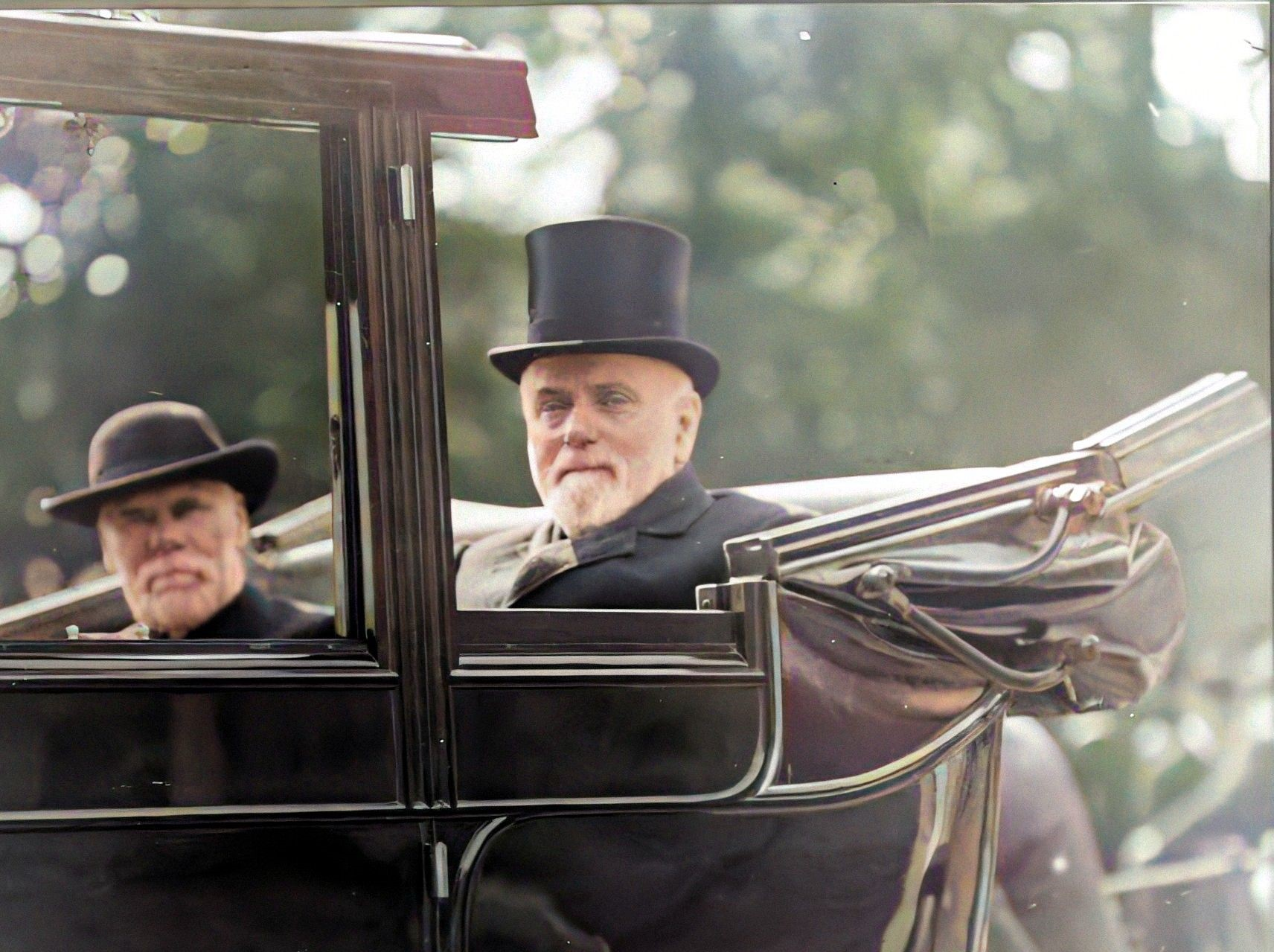
- Hartley (right) in 1900
- Born: 23 February 1846; Colne, Lancashire
- Died: 25 October 1922 (aged 76)
- Known for: Jam manufacturing

Sir William Pickles Hartley (23 February 1846 – 25 October 1922) was an English entrepreneur, jam manufacturer and philanthropist who in 1871 founded the Hartley's jam company.

== Biography ==
Hartley was born on 23 February 1846 in Colne, Lancashire, the only surviving child of John Hartley, a tinsmith, and his wife, Margaret Pickles. The family had lived near Pendle since c. 1620 and worked as grocers, building Wycoller Hall towards the end of the 16th century. He married Martha Horsfield. Hartley attended a local British and Foreign School Society school.

The business started in 1871 as the result of a chance event. It is said that when a supplier failed to deliver a batch of jam, William made his own. His jam, marmalade, and jelly sold well in his own distinctive earthenware pots and in 1874 the business transferred to Bootle. In 1880 Hartley moved to Southport, where he became known as an influential local benefactor and entrepreneur, and an active member of the local Methodist Church. One of his daughters, Christiana (b. 1872), became Southport's first woman Mayor in 1921. Other children included Maggy, Polly, Sarah, John, and Clara. Cephas Hartley was instrumental in reviving Elmfield College when it was in danger of collapse in 1906.

== Philanthropy ==
Hartley was a Primitive Methodist and applied his Christian principles to business. In 1888 he built a model village at Aintree (since named by the Victorian Society as a set of heritage buildings at risk of disrepair). The following year he introduced a profit-sharing scheme, the results each year being announced at a special ceremony, with music and speeches. He claimed that the wages he paid to women and girls – four-fifths of the workforce – were appreciably higher than those of his competitors; he also provided free medical treatment. He personally chose his managers and trained them, sending them on advanced chemistry courses at his own expense of nearly £300,000. He preferred to donate part of any sum requested, so as to encourage others to give. He endowed a number of hospitals in Colne, Liverpool, and London, and financed departments at Liverpool and Manchester universities. Equally generous to Primitive Methodism, he supported an organization for building chapels, acted as treasurer of its missionary society, and converted the old Holborn Town Hall into its national headquarters.

=== Hartley Lectures ===
In 1896 the Primitive Methodists created the Hartley lectures in recognition of W. P. Hartley's work, the inaugural lectures were given in 1897.

Year	LECTURER	SUBJECT
1897	J. Ferguson, D.D.	"The Holy Spirit in the Salvation of Men" (delivered, but not published).
1898	J. Watson, D.D.	"The Fatherhood of God."
1899	Robert Bryant	"Inspiration and Revelation."
1900	J. Smith	"Christ and Missions."
1901	Holliday Bickerstaffe Kendall B.A.	"Christ's Kingdom and Church in the Nineteenth Century."
1902	R. G. Graham	"The Sabbath : its Grounds, Obligations and Benefits."
1903	Joseph Odell	"Evangelism as found in the New Testament and in the Present Time."
1904	Prof. A. S. Peake, M.A.	"The Problem of Suffering in the Old Testament."
1905	Thomas Mitchell	"Christian Beneficence : its Special Relation to Systematic Giving."
1906	Henry Yooll	"The Ethics of Evangelicalism."
1907	J. Day Thompson	"The Doctrine of Immortality in its Present-day Aspects."
1908	G. Parkin, B.D.	"The New Testament Portrait of Jesus."
1909	Joseph Ritson	"Romance of Primitive Methodism."
1910	Robert Hind	"Sin and the Preacher" (Not delivered or published).
1911	J. Dodd Jackson	"The Message and the Man : a Lecture on Preaching."
1912	A. L. Humphries, M.A.	"The Holy Spirit in Faith and Experience."
1913	James Pickett	"The Modern Missionary Crisis."
1914	F. N. Shimmin	"Permanent Values in Religion."
1915	J. P. Langham	"The Supreme Quest": or, The Nature and Practice of Mystical Religion."
1916	No Lecture given owing to the Great War.	
1917	No Lecture given owing to the Great War.	
1918	No Lecture given owing to the Great War.	

In 1932 with the amalgamation of the Methodist Churches, the Primitive Methodist Hartley Lecture was combined with the Wesleyan Methodist Fernley Lecture to form the modern day Fernley-Hartley Lectures, which still continue today.

In 1906 the Manchester theological college for training Primitive Methodist ministers was renamed Hartley College, Manchester (later Hartley Victoria College), in recognition of his benefactions. He propagated his ideas in his only published work, The Use of Wealth (n.d.). Uniquely for a layman, he was elected president of the Primitive Methodist conference in 1909. His relative Cephas Hartley was instrumental in reviving Elmfield, the Primitive Methodist college in 1906 (see picture in Booth 1990: 52C).

== Family ==
An excerpt from The Life of Sir William Hartley by A. S. Peake reads as follows:

"... Robert Hartley, Sir William's uncle, was a man of very handsome presence and exceptionally fine character. He became a Primitive Methodist minister at an early age, and after spending a quarter of a century in England, went to Australia and laboured for thirty-two years in Queensland. One feature of his many-sided activity was his kindness to the emigrants from England whom he met at the landing-stage. His home was at Rockhampton on the coast; but he covered a wide field, reaching from Brisbane nearly to the Gulf of Carpentaria. He was apparently too much occupied to send home reports of his work; so Dr Samuel Antliff, when he was sent to visit Australia, was instructed to make investigations. He found him the leading man in Rockhampton. His fellow-citizens celebrated his ministerial Jubilee and presented him with a purse of gold; and after his death dedicated a public fountain to his memory. A Hartley Memorial Chapel also commemorates his work. A letter from Dr McLaren may fitly be quoted at this point. It was written on 23 July 1892. "Mr Hartley was in Southampton during several years of my pastorate there, when I learned to esteem him very highly for his earnestness, warmth of heart, bright temperament, diligence and self-forgetfulness. I had the pleasure of a visit from him when he was in England some years since, and have always cherished warm feelings of friendship for him. I share with your denomination the sense of loss by his death, and should be glad if you would tell Mr Hartley of Aintree how truly I esteemed and honoured his uncle."

Rev Robert Hartley and family came to Australia on board the ship "Echo". It departed from London and arrived in Sydney on 22 June 1860. The family members that came with him were: Mrs Jane Hartley, Miss AC Hartley, Master WJ Hartley, Master RT Hartley, Master SW Hartley and Miss Jane E Hartley. "Echo" details: Of Glasgow, Captain James Price, Master, Burthen 1189 Tons.

Sir William Pickles Hartley's Family Tree

The Hartley legacy has now been passed down to Emma Hartley who is currently studying in Manchester. She is following the tradition and making her own jam.

== Chronology ==
(from Peake, Arthur S. (1926) The Life of Sir William Hartley. 1st ed. Hodder & Stoughton)

- Born at Colne, 23 February 1846.
- Educated at the British School and the Grammar School, Colne.
- Left school at the age of fourteen. Started in business for himself in Colne at the age of sixteen.
- At the age of twenty married Miss Martha Horsfield of Colne on Whit-Monday, 21 May 1866.
- Death of his mother at the age of forty-six on 18 May 1870.
- Removed to Bootle, 1874.
- Vow to devote a specific proportion of income to religious and charitable purposes made 1 January 1877.
- Offer of £1,000 if the debt of the Primitive Methodist Missionary Society was paid off, 1884.
- Presided at the meeting of the Primitive Methodist Missionary Society at which the removal of the debt was announced, May 1885.
- Communicated to the Primitive Methodist Conference the suggestions which led to the formation of the Chapel Aid Association, 1885.
- 1886: Built jam manufacturing factory at Aintree.
- Chapel Aid Association registered, 2 January 1890.
- Elected General Treasurer of the Primitive Methodist Missionary Society, 7 June 1890.
- Removed from Inglewood, Birkdale, to Aintree at the end of October 1890.
- Visited Oxford, where he celebrated his silver wedding, May 1891.
- Proposed new departure in ministerial education to the Conference of 1891.
- 1891–92, supported the majority of Everton FC members in an internal dispute which resulted in the club moving to Goodison Park creating Liverpool F.C.
- Death of his father, 27 January 1892.
- Elected vice-president of conference, June 1892.
- Jubilee Fund inaugurated at this conference. On his suggestion sum to be raised fixed at £50,000, towards which he promised £5,000.
- Addressed meetings all over the country on behalf of the Jubilee Fund, 1892–3.
- Appointed Justice of the Peace, 18 August 1893.
- Member of the Liverpool City Council, 1895–8.
- Elected on the Walton School Board, 14 January 1895.
- Aintree Institute and Cafe opened, 1896.
- 1896: Founded Hartley Lectureship
- First extension of Primitive Methodist College, Manchester, 1897.
- London business started, 1900.
- Cottage Hospital opened at Colne, 20 April 1900.
- Botanical Laboratory, University College, Liverpool, opened 10 May 1902.
- Removed from Aintree to "Sea View," Southport, 1904.
- Second extension of Hartley College opened, June 1906.
- Primitive Methodist Centenary Celebrations, 1907–10. He was appointed Treasurer of the Centenary Fund and contributed £15,000.
- 1908: Knighted
- 1908: Purchased Holborn Town Hall for £31,000; he enlarged it and erected a new Publishing House. The enlarged premises were bought from him at cost price (about £50,000) by the Primitive Methodist Church. To this he contributed £17,500.
- President of the Primitive Methodist Conference held at Southport, June 1909.
- Freedom of Colne conferred, 9 November 1909.
- Pension Fund inaugurated, 1909.
- Hartley Homes opened at Colne, 1911.
- Unveiled windows presented by him to Hartley College, 11 June 1914.
- Seventieth birthday, 23 February 1916. Gifts in commemoration to Hospitals, Pension Fund, Grocers' Charities.
- Golden wedding, 21 May 1916.
- Address of congratulation from the Primitive Methodist Conference, June 1916.
- Removed from Southport to Birkdale, 1919.
- Business converted into a Limited Liability Company, 1919.
- Declined to accept Mayoralty of Colne, 1919.
- Laid foundation-stone of Colne Hospital, 3 September 1921.
- Miss Hartley became Mayor of Southport, 9 November 1921.
- Death of Sir William Hartley, Wednesday, 25 October 1922.
- Funeral service at Church Street, Southport, and interment at Trawden, Saturday, 28 October 1922.
- Christiana Hartley, proposed to construct a Maternity Hospital in Southport. The plans were accepted and the Maternity Hospital opened in May 1932.
