= St Helens and Knowsley Teaching Hospitals NHS Trust =

NHS hospital trust

- Type: NHS hospital trust
- Budget: £230 million
- Hospitals: Whiston Hospital; St Helens Hospital
- Chair: Richard Fraser
- Chief executive: Ann Marr
- Staff: 4,000

St Helens and Knowsley Teaching Hospitals NHS Trust was an NHS Trust that operated from 1991 until 2023, based in Whiston, Merseyside. The trust became part of Mersey and West Lancashire Teaching Hospitals NHS Trust on 1 July 2023.

It ran two major hospitals:

- Whiston Hospital - the primary site and trust headquarters providing emergency and acute inpatient services, alongside a maternity unit and the Mersey Regional Burns and Plastic Surgery Unit.
- St Helens Hospital, a diagnostic and treatment centre which houses non-acute outpatient services, transitional rehabilitation facilities and a day case surgical suite.

In 2012 the trust's bid for NHS Foundation Trust status was escalated for Department of Health scrutiny, after a series of issues.

The trust was the lead employer for junior doctors in the North West of England, holding contracts for around 5,500 doctors in training. In November 2020 it set up the North West Doctors in Training Collaborative Staff Bank, enabling hospitals to broadcast shifts they have been unable to fill and minimise the administrative burden of using temporary staff, and enabling junior doctors who pick up additional shifts to receive their pay via their normal payroll service.

== PFI ==
The trust has a substantial Private Finance Initiative contract. Innisfree Ltd, Vinci SA. Medirest and GE are the partners. The 35 year PFI contract is delivered by NewHospitals, a Special Purpose Company formed by Taylor Woodrow and Innisfree.

== Primary care ==
The trust took over Marshalls Cross Medical Centre in 2017 and planned to take over five more general practices in St Helens in 2019.

== Information technology ==
The trust was an early adopter of Electronic health records and in 2010 it was the first trust to stop using paper medical records in clinical practice.

It was also an early adopter of Electronic Staff Records after it became the lead employer for approximately 2,300 junior doctors on the Cheshire and Merseyside Deanery programme.

It reduced the rates of patients who did not attend radiology department appointments in 2021 using the efficienC appointment management text messaging solution provided by Wellbeing Software. There was an average reduction of 81% over the pilot term in patients who did not attend.

== Performance ==
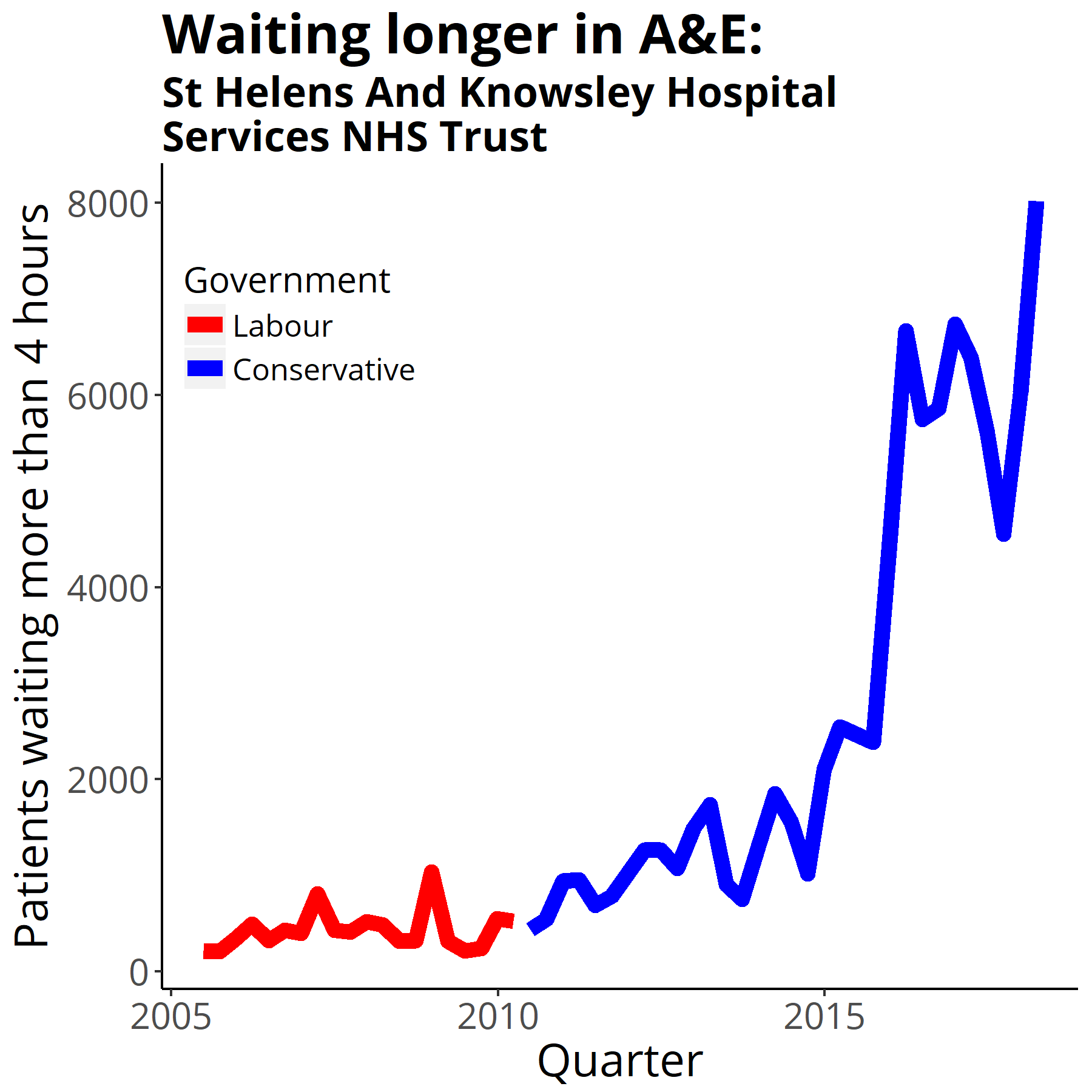
Four-hour target in the emergency department quarterly figures from NHS England Data from https://www.england.nhs.uk/statistics/statistical-work-areas/ae-waiting-times-and-activity/

The trust did very well in the 2014 cancer patient experience survey and has agreed to pair up with Ashford and St Peter's Hospitals NHS Foundation Trust, which did badly, in a scheme intended to “spread and accelerate innovative practice via peer to peer support and learning”.

It was named by the Health Service Journal as one of the top hundred National Health Service (NHS) trusts to work for in 2015. At that time it had 4136 full time equivalent staff and a sickness absence rate of 3.75%. 78% of staff recommend it as a place for treatment and 72% recommended it as a place to work.

After an inspection in August 2015 the trust was one of only three in England rated "outstanding" by the Care Quality Commission. The hospital's outpatient department was said to be "the best we have inspected so far".
