= Southport General Infirmary =

- Southport General Infirmary, circa 1960s

- Former location in Southport

Geography
- Location: Southport, Merseyside, England, United Kingdom
- Coordinates: 53.639°N 2.986°W

Organisation
- Care system: Public NHS
- Type: General Hospital
- Affiliated university: Edge Hill College

Services
- Emergency department: Until 1988
- Beds: c.200

History
- Founded: 1870
- Closed: 1999

Links
- Lists: Hospitals in England

Southport General Infirmary was a Victorian hospital that was Southport's first major hospital. The first construction of the building started in October 1892, with the first patients being seen at the hospital in September 1895.

== History ==
=== The first infirmary ===
Southport Infirmary was the first hospital in Southport, it was constructed on Virginia Street in 1870 and opened in 1871 to accommodate six male patients and six female patients. It also had two sidewards by where patients with infectious diseases were isolated. The hospital proved so popular that a new site was sought for the construction of a new and bigger hospital.

=== The new infirmary ===
The Scarisbrick family who resided at Scarisbrick Hall gave a five-acre site on which the Infirmary once stood. The foundation stone was laid on 27 October 1892 and the hospital opened on 26 September 1895. The buildings were erected at a total cost of £25,000 this then provided accommodation for 60 patients in the men's, women's and children's wards.

=== First World War ===
Queen Elizabeth Children's Ward, taken 1946

In 1899, following expansion of the local area it served to include Ainsdale, the Infirmary merged with The Eye, Ear and Throat Hospital. The three years leading up to the outbreak of the First World War saw the growth of the hospital building with a new ward and the opening of a new Massage Department and X-ray Department. During the First World War, a further 120 beds for wounded soldiers where needed and saw the construction of yet another ward, a new Anaesthetic Room and Pathology Department in 1916. The services were stretched during the war as by 1918 a total of 1,173 wounded and invalided British soldiers had been seen at the hospital. After the First World War an Artificial Sunlight Department was added to the facilities as well as further accommodation for the staff and the construction of more wards and minor improvements to the hospital services as the town grew.

=== Inter-war ===
In 1928 Christiana Hartley, the daughter of Sir William Pickles Hartley the founder of Hartley's Jam, proposed to construct a Maternity Hospital for the town. The plans were accepted and the Maternity Hospital opened in May 1932 on the Curzon Road side of the site. The Maternity services where independently managed, although the Infirmary provided the nursing, food, medicine, laundry and other requirements.

=== Second World War ===
In June 1939 construction began on a new Women's Surgical Ward followed by the outbreak of war in the September. The hospital therefore built an extra 117 emergency beds to add to the 150 general beds the hospital already had. In 1943 the hospital services were becoming stretched due to the demand of health care, this was when the Appointments System for outpatients was introduced, this provided follow-up clinics for the 173 wounded soldiers which were admitted during the year. In 1944 a new Rehabilitation Department was opened to help the injured soldiers from the war. In the Infirmary's silver jubilee year, plans were made for an additional 178 beds.

=== Post war ===
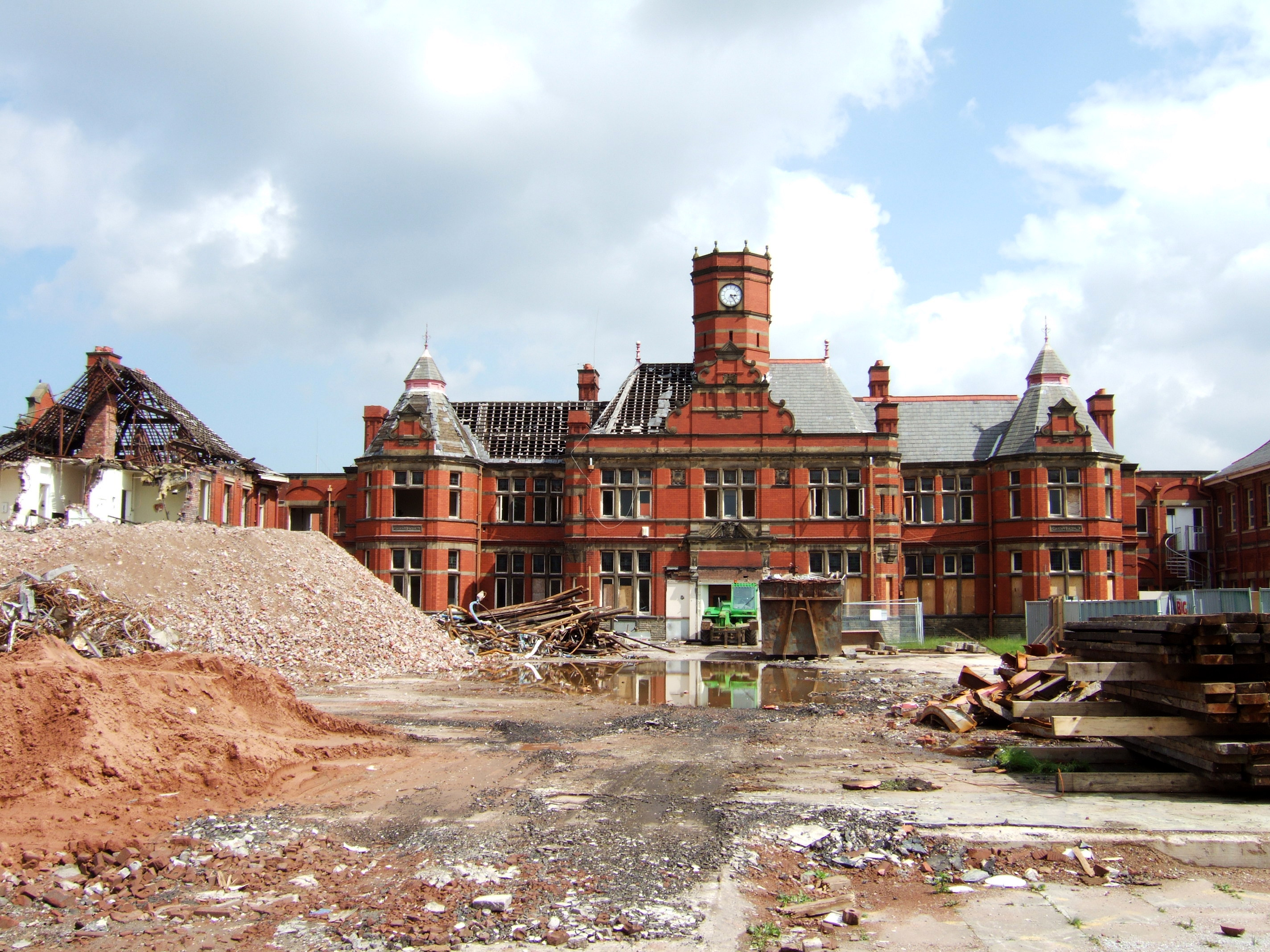
The main infirmary site during demolition in 2008

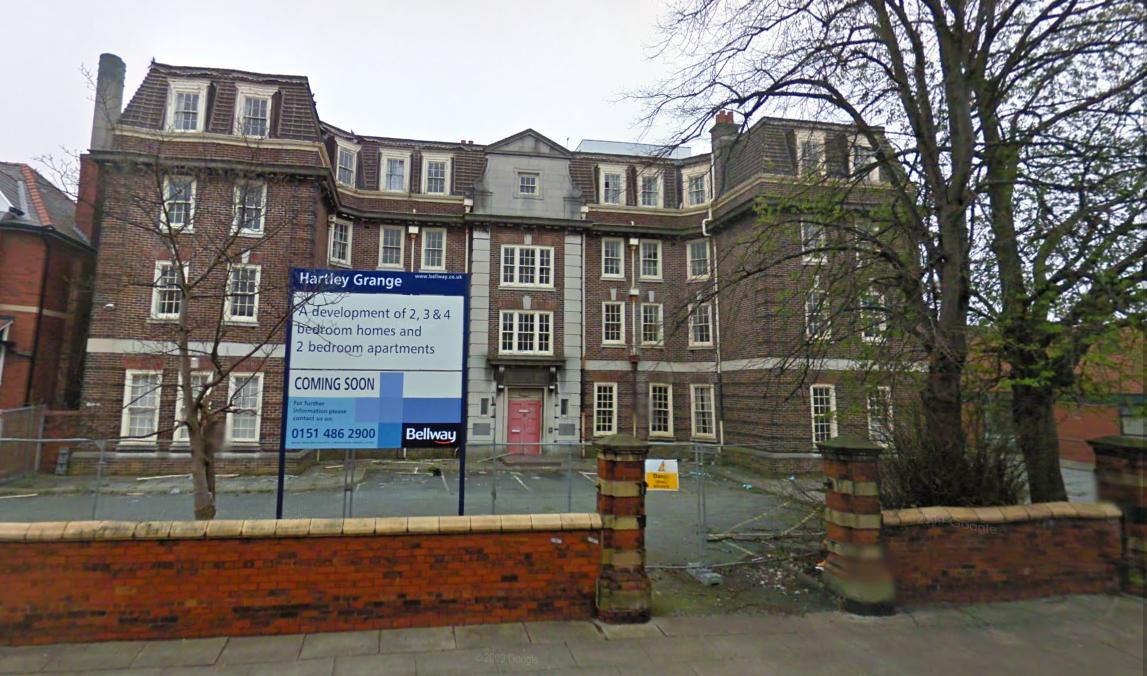
The nurses' accommodation on Pilkington Road in 2009

On 5 July 1948, the National Health Service took over the ownership and management of the Infirmary. It was one of 14 hospitals under Liverpool Regional Hospital Board. During the 1950s and 1960s the hospital dramatically continued to improve and expand its facilities. This included the provision of emergency lighting, a staff canteen and improvements to staff accommodation. Also a new Pharmacy, which allowed the overrun Outpatient and Casualty Department to be separated into two distinct departments. In 1963 saw the improvements and extensions to the theatre facilities and a new mortuary refrigeration unit was built. While in 1966 an automatic film processing unit was added to the X-ray Department.

The first half of the 1960s saw a thirty per cent increase in surgical work at the Infirmary and an increase of 20 per cent in all services at the hospital. In 1966 the total of beds the hospital offered was 104 and rising to 205 beds by 1978. The facilities at the Infirmary were stretched as the ever-increasing population continued to grow in the local area. It was identified by the health board that a new hospital was needed to provide sufficient facilities for the increasing demands. Plans were put in place for the building of the Southport and Formby District General Hospital on the former Kew Gardens site on Town Lane.

The vast majority of services moved to Southport and Formby District General Hospital in 1988. Some of the less acute services, such as the eye unit, the ear, nose & throat unit, audiology, chiropody, speech therapy, services for the elderly and some pathology services, remained at the Infirmary with the main entrance relocated to Pilkington Road. Also the spinal injuries unit moved from the Southport Promenade Hospital to the Southport General Infirmary at that time.

The Christiana Hartley maternity unit and the other remaining services provided on the infirmary site moved to new accommodation at the Southport and Formby District General Hospital in 1999. The infirmary was demolished in 2008 and the site was subsequently redeveloped for residential use as Hartley Grange.
