= Whiston Hospital =

- Mersey and West Lancashire Teaching Hospitals NHS Trust
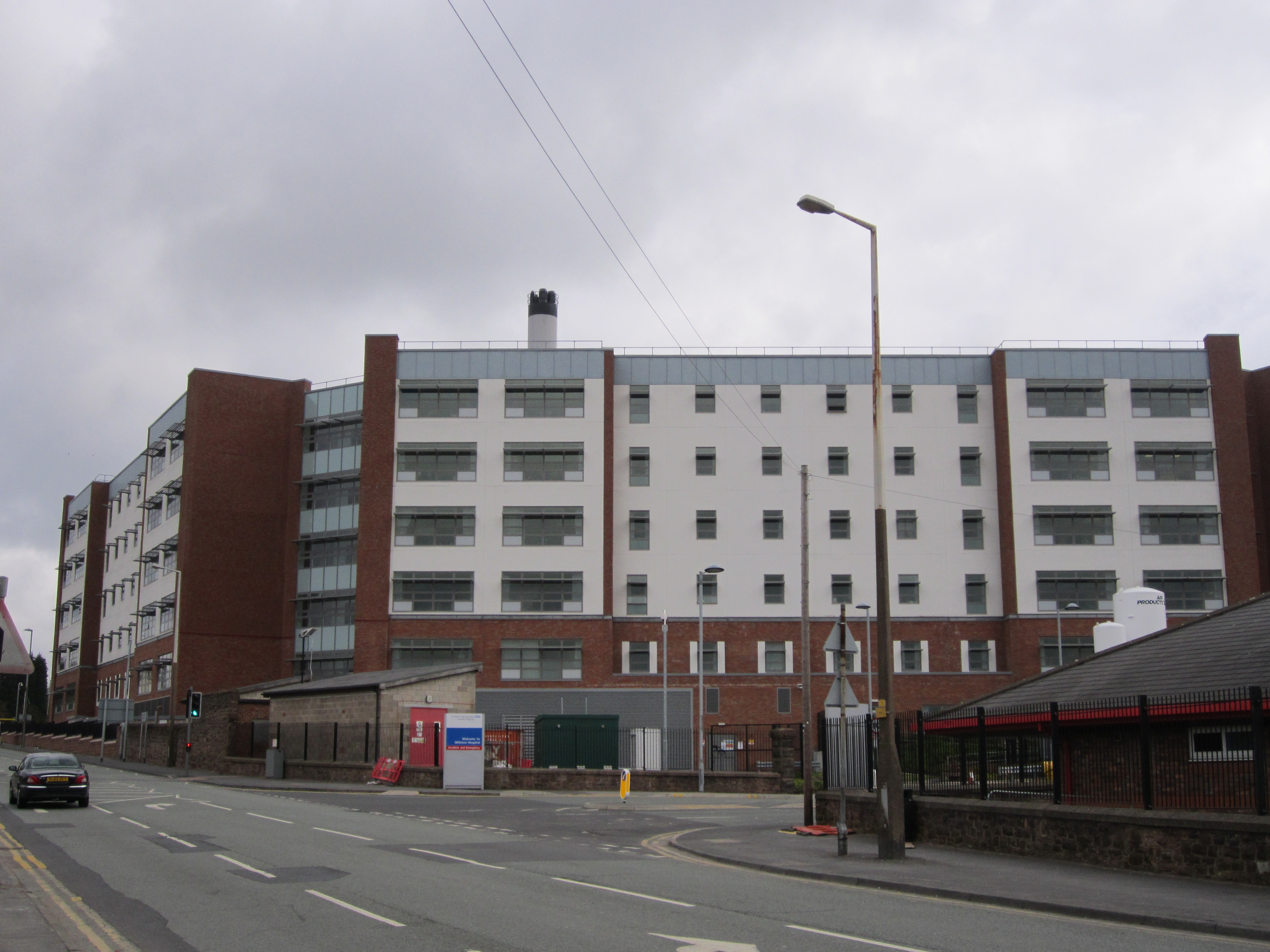
- A&E entrance of Whiston Hospital

- Location within Merseyside

Geography
- Location: Warrington Road, Prescot, Merseyside, L35 5DR
- Coordinates: 53.42085°N 2.78768°W

Organisation
- Care system: Public NHS
- Type: Teaching
- Affiliated university: University of Liverpool, Liverpool John Moores University, Edge Hill University

Services
- Emergency department: A&E, burn center
- Beds: 956
- Speciality: Burns and Plastic Surgery

History
- Founded: 1843 as Prescot Union Workhouse

Links
- Website: sthk.merseywestlancs.nhs.uk/whiston-hospital

Whiston Hospital is an acute general hospital in Whiston, Merseyside, though its postal address places it in adjacent Prescot. The hospital is managed by Mersey and West Lancashire Teaching Hospitals NHS Trust.

== History ==
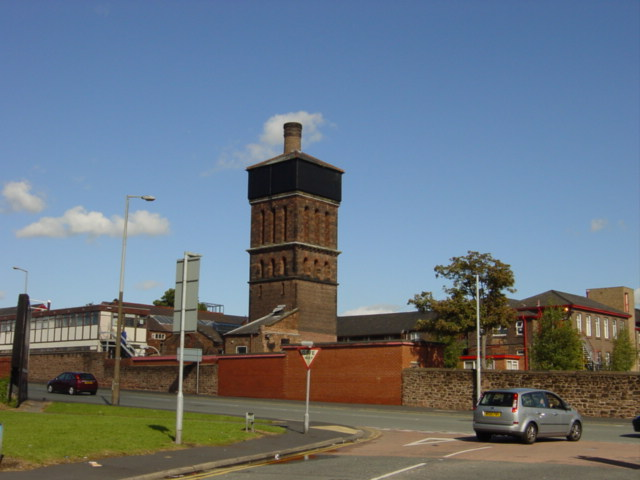
Old Whiston Hospital, 2005

The original hospital at Whiston was established when Prescot Poor Law Union established the Prescot Union Workhouse on Warrington Road in 1843. In 1871 a new general hospital was built with a medical isolation unit added in 1887 for cases of cholera and other serious infectious diseases of the time. From 1904, to protect those from disadvantage in later life, birth certificates of infants born in the workhouse simply gave their address as 1 Warrington Road, Whiston.

When the NHS was established in 1948, the hospital, then known as the County Hospital, had 6 main blocks of wards accommodating 500 patients. Renamed Whiston Hospital in 1953, the hospital expanded its range of specialties.

In 1960 the 82 bed Burns & Plastic Surgery Unit opened and four years later an Intensive Care Unit and a Pathology Laboratory were built. In 1973 these were joined by a Maternity & Gynaecology Unit and Postgraduate Medical Centre. A scheme to rebuild the hospital was procured under a Private Finance Initiative contract in 2006. The works were carried out by Vinci, as part of a scheme with St Helens Hospital, at a cost of £338 million. To mark the completion of the project, the new hospital was officially opened by the Countess of Wessex on 24 April 2013. The only remaining building of the former hospital is the G-Ward block (since converted for administrative and educational facilities and now known as Nightingale House) which was opened in 1996 by the late Dr Eric Sherwood-Jones, a Whiston Hospital doctor and pioneer of intensive care medicine in the UK.

== Facilities ==
As a teaching hospital, it has well established educational and research relationships with the University of Liverpool and Liverpool John Moores University for medical, nursing and allied health professionals. Over 4,000 members of staff are employed across the organisation and as Lead Employer, on behalf of the Mersey Deanery, it is responsible for an additional 2,000 trainee speciality doctors based in hospitals and GP practice placements throughout Merseyside and Cheshire. Whiston Hospital offers the full range of acute healthcare services along with specialist burn care in the Mersey Regional Burns and Plastic Surgery Centre, serving a population of over 6 million people across Merseyside, Cheshire and other parts of northwest England, as well as North Wales and the Isle of Man.

== Notable births ==
- Melanie C, singer with the Spice Girls
- Steven Gerrard, footballer and manager
- Kym Marsh, singer with Hear'Say
- Dave McCabe, singer and guitarist with The Zutons
- Willy Russell, playwright and composer
- William Snowden, cricketer
