= Southport and Formby District General Hospital =

- Mersey and West Lancashire Teaching Hospitals NHS Trust
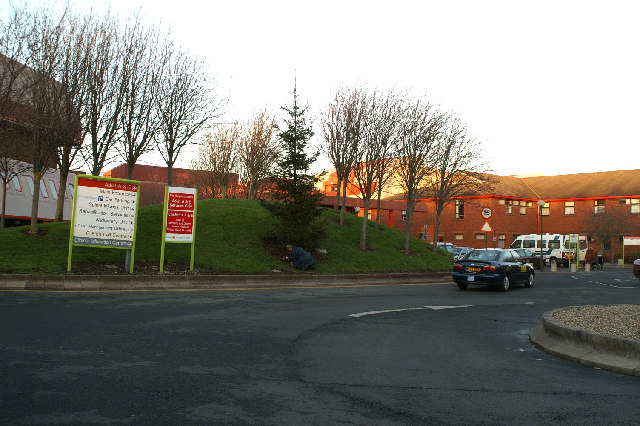
- Southport and Formby District General Hospital

- Location in Southport

Geography
- Location: Southport, Merseyside, England, United Kingdom
- Coordinates: 53.6338°N 2.9787°W

Organisation
- Care system: Public NHS
- Type: General Hospital

History
- Founded: 1988

Links
- Website: so.merseywestlancs.nhs.uk/southport-hospital
- Lists: Hospitals in England

Southport and Formby District General Hospital is an acute hospital at Kew in Southport, Merseyside. It is managed by the Mersey and West Lancashire Teaching Hospitals NHS Trust.

== History ==
The hospital, which replaced the Southport General Infirmary and the Southport Promenade Hospital, opened in September 1988. A major expansion of the accident and emergency department was commissioned in February 2018.
