= Ormskirk District General Hospital =

Ormskirk and District General Hospital
- Mersey and West Lancashire Teaching Hospitals NHS Trust
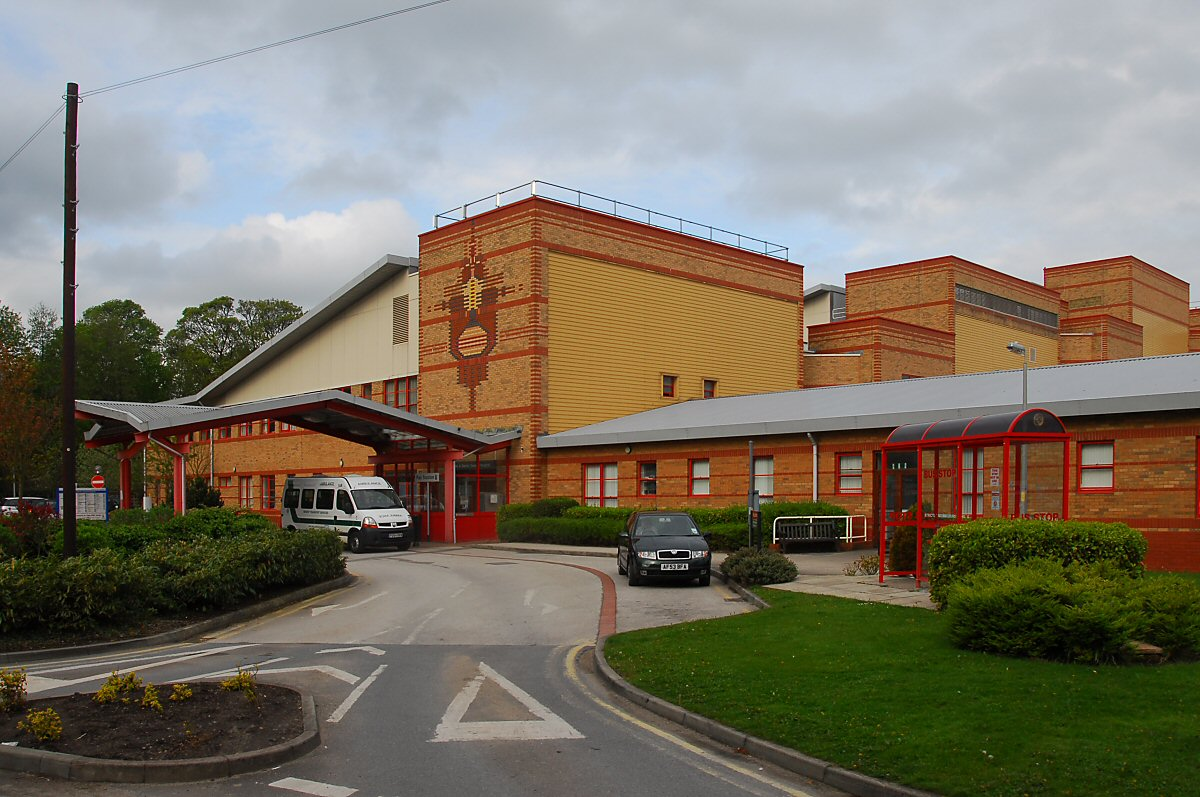
- Ormskirk and District General Hospital

- Location in Lancashire

Geography
- Location: Ormskirk, Lancashire, England, United Kingdom
- Coordinates: 53.5641°N 2.8719°W

Organisation
- Care system: Public NHS
- Type: District General Hospital

Services
- Emergency department: Children only (8am to midnight)

History
- Founded: 1853

Links
- Website: https://so.merseywestlancs.nhs.uk/ormskirk-hospital
- Lists: Hospitals in England

Ormskirk and District General Hospital is an acute hospital in Ormskirk, Lancashire. It is managed by the Mersey and West Lancashire Teaching Hospitals NHS Trust.

== History ==
The hospital has its origins in the Ormskirk Union Workhouse Infirmary which was established in 1853. It became the County Hospital and Institution in the 1930s and, after joining the National Health Service in 1948, it went on to become Ormskirk County Hospital in the 1950s and subsequently Ormskirk and District General Hospital.
