= Botleys Mansion =

Palladian mansion house in Surrey, England

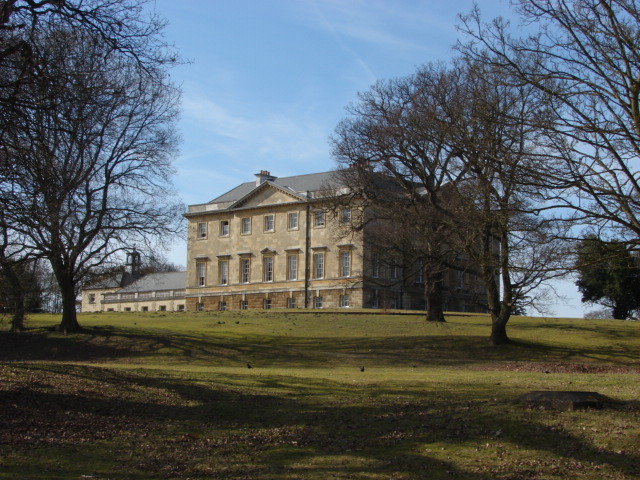
- Botleys Mansion

- Location within Surrey
- 51°22′26.1″N 0°32′1.8″W
- Location: Chertsey, Surrey
- OS grid reference: TQ 02142 64884

History
- Built: 1760s

Site notes
- Architect: Kenton Couse
- Architectural style: Palladian
- Owner: Bijou Wedding Venues

Listed Building – Grade II*
- Official name: Botleys Park Hospital
- Designated: 9 July 1972
- Reference no.: 1029181

Botleys Mansion (previously known as Botleys Park) is a Palladian mansion house in the south of Chertsey, Surrey, England, just south of St Peter's Hospital. The house was built in the 1760s by builders funded by Joseph Mawbey and to designs by Kenton Couse. The elevated site once bore a 14th-century manor house seized along with all the other manors of Chertsey from Chertsey Abbey, a very rich abbey, under Henry VIII's Dissolution of the Monasteries and today much of its land is owned by two hospitals, one public, one private, and the local council authority. The remaining mansion and the near park surrounding were used for some decades as a colony hospital and as a private care home. The building is owned and used by a wedding venues company.

It is a Grade II* listed building.

== History ==
The building standing today was built c.1765 as a replacement of an old manor. The mansion's ownership was transferred often throughout its history.

The House and the surrounding 344 acre estate was purchased by Surrey County Council in late 1929 for a reported sum of £31,000 (equivalent to £1,702,707 in 2025). A psychiatric facility known as the Botley's Colony was established at the House during the 1930s. The plan for the new layout of the new buildings was by the architects J.M. Sheppard & co circa 1935.

The Metropolitan Asylums Board was dissolved in 1930 and responsibility for caring for the mentally deficient was passed to the (local government) Councils. Surrey County Council decided set up new buildings to house patients while the mansion housed the hospital staff becoming designated from 1932 Botley's Park hospital, which specialised in patients with psychiatric disorders. It was reported in 1931 that the Surrey County Council had voted approximately £440,000 (equivalent to £25,914,496 in 2025) for the expansion of the Botleys Colony, which would allow it to accommodate up to 1,500 patients.

The first section of the new hospital was opened on 24 June 1939 by Lady Henriques, wife of then chairman of the Council Sir Philip Henriques. In September of the same year, many of the hospital's patients were moved to Murray House in nearby Ottershaw so that Botleys could receive wounded soldiers from the war. During this time, the mansion was adapted into a nurses' home.

The mansion was damaged by fire in 1994 and within two years, most of the nurses' home closed down. It was restored by P&O Developments between 1996 and 1997.

== Architecture ==
In architecture it is Grade II* listed, the middle category of listing, which as with the top category (Grade I) applies to less than one third of listed buildings.

It is a Couse stone-built house in simple Palladian architecture without wings, with walls clad in stone and surrounded by park land and iron gates. The stone came from quarries at Headington, Oxfordshire and Barrington, Cambridgeshire.

The house is almost cubic in form, and the estate was about two miles in circumference, today about a mile; and approximately square, thus 0.25 square miles (0.65 km^{2}). A double flight of steps leads to the marble-paved entrance hall of the house. The entrance hall ceiling is supported by Scagliola columns and Ionic pilasters.

== Ownership ==
In 1319, the original Botleys Park Estate was either owned by John de Butteley or John Manory of Chertsey. In 1505, de Butteley's son Thomas gave the House to Richard Merland, Thomas Pervoche, and Henry Wykes; soon after though, Wykes became the sole owner of the mansion, then called Botlese Mansion. Ownership of the mansion changed hands several times and was owned by Henry VIII in 1541, after he purchased it from Sir Roger Cholmeley. In 1763, the mansion was transferred to Joseph Mawbey, the man responsible for the house's reconstruction. The mansion was passed around after Mawbey's death until it was purchased by Robert Gosling in 1822.

Botleys Park remained in the ownership of the Gosling family until 1929; the final private owner of the house was Barclays Director and 1901 High Sheriff of Surrey Herbert Gosling. The 1921 Census of England returns for Chertsey, Surrey record that Gosling employed a large household at Botleys Park, which included seven indoor servants (a Butler, Cook, kitchen maid, scullery maid, footman, and two housemaids) and eight outdoor servants (a head gardener, two gardeners, a groom, stableman, stockman, farm carter and carpenter).

Gosling died on 25 February 1929; his gross estate was valued at £839,130 (equivalent to £46,090,076 in 2025) for probate, with some £270,000 in death duties deducted from the £773,116 net estate. Following his death the Surrey County Council purchased the Botleys Park and its 344-acre estate for a reported £31,000.

The mansion was bought and restored by a company, Bijou Wedding Venues, in 2010 and is used to host weddings and events.
