= St Helens Hospital, Merseyside =

St Helens Hospital
- Mersey and West Lancashire Teaching Hospitals NHS Trust
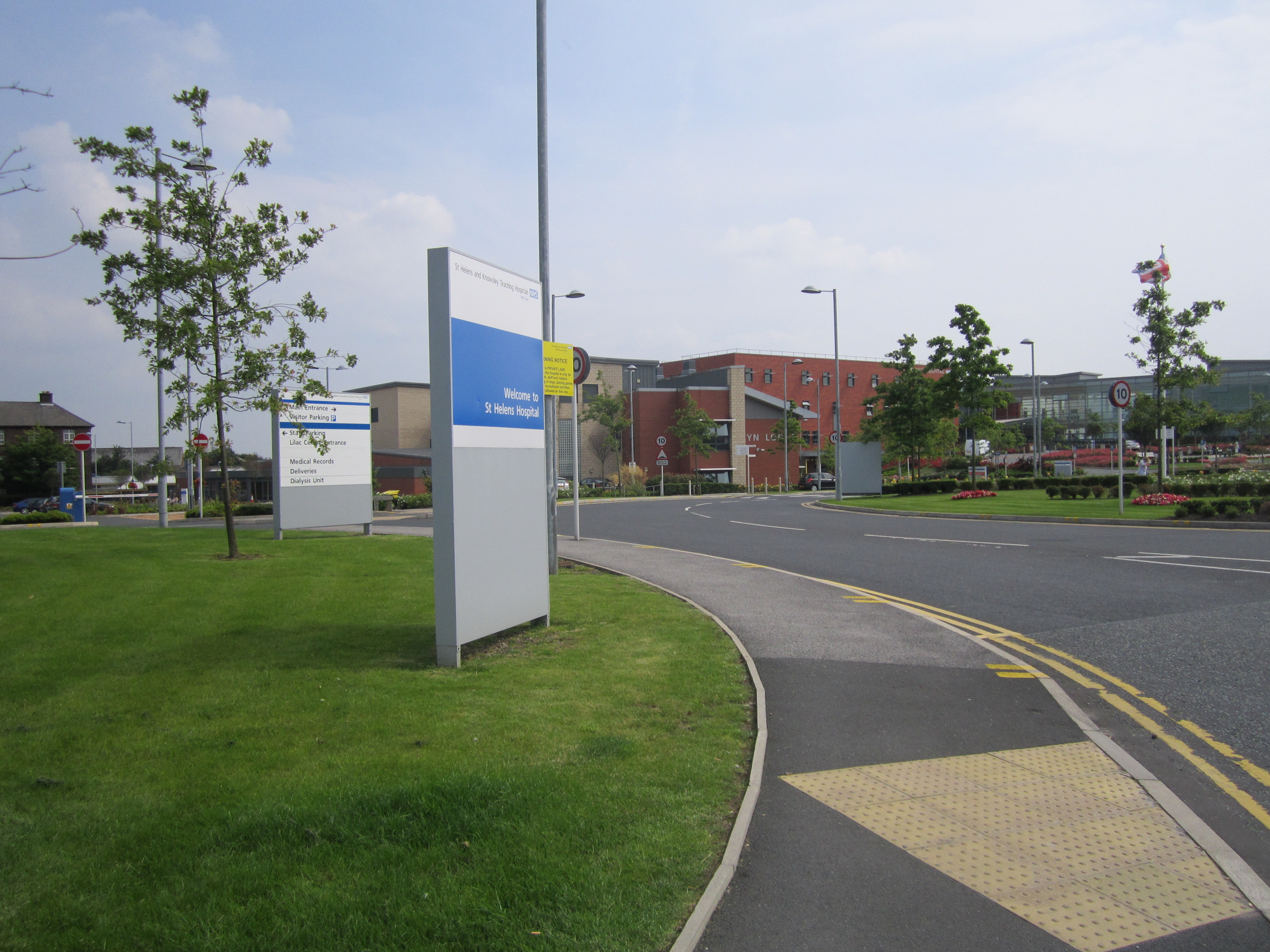
- St Helens Hospital

- Location within Merseyside

Geography
- Location: St Helens, Merseyside, England
- Coordinates: 53.4394°N 2.7190°W

Organisation
- Care system: NHS
- Type: Diagnostic and treatment centre

History
- Founded: 1873

Links
- Website: sthk.merseywestlancs.nhs.uk/st-helens-hospital
- Lists: Hospitals in England

St Helens Hospital is a health facility at St Helens, Merseyside. It is managed by Mersey and West Lancashire Teaching Hospitals NHS Trust.

== History ==
The hospital has its origins in a cottage hospital in Marshall Cross Road which opened in 1873. The hospital joined the National Health Service in 1948. A scheme to rebuild the hospital was procured under a Private Finance Initiative contract in 2006. The works were carried out by Vinci, as part of a scheme with Whiston Hospital, at a cost of £338 million. It was completed in 2008 and was officially opened by the Duke of York in 2010.
