= Southport Promenade Hospital =

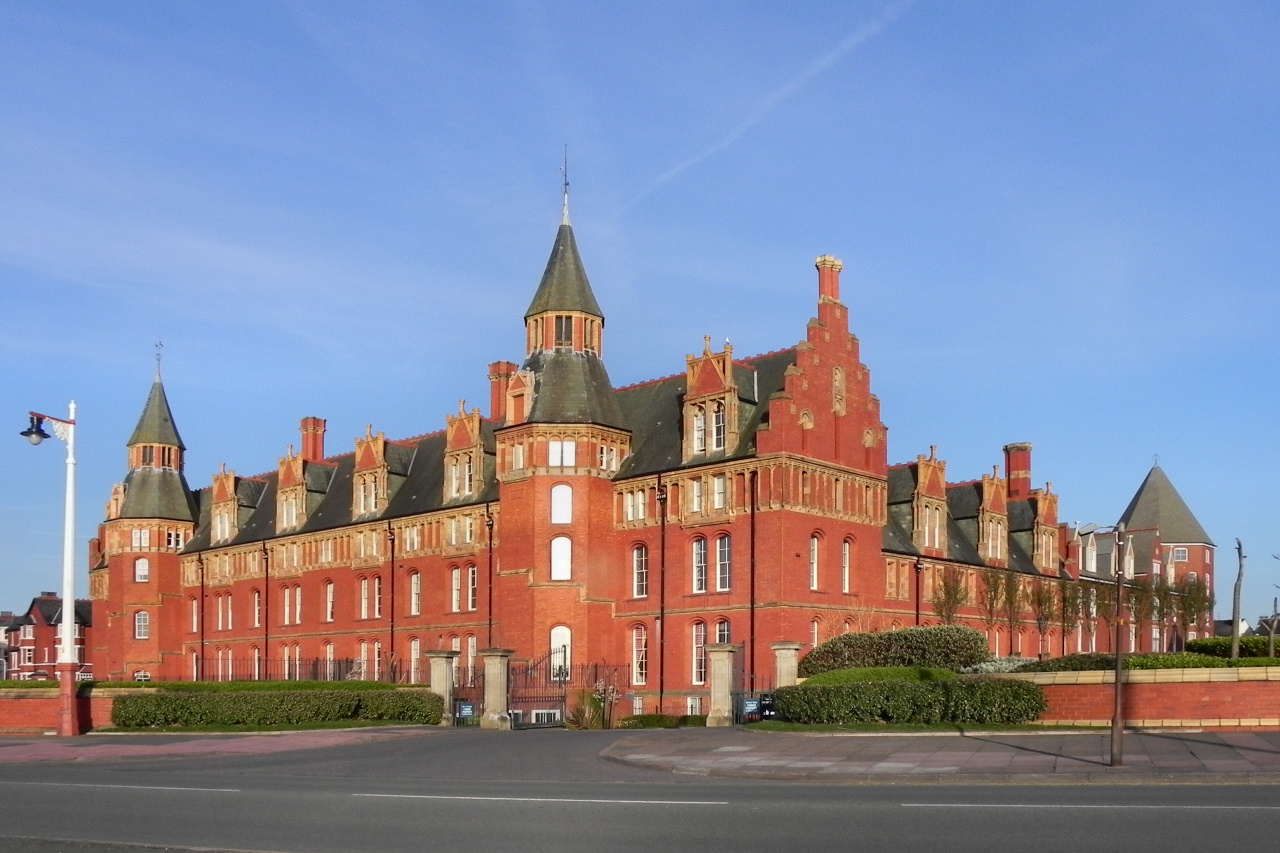
- Southport Promenade Hospital

- Former location in Southport

Geography
- Location: Southport, Merseyside, England, United Kingdom
- Coordinates: 53.653922°N 3.002064°W

Organisation
- Care system: Public NHS
- Type: General Hospital

History
- Founded: 1806
- Closed: 1990

Links
- Lists: Hospitals in England

Southport Promenade Hospital is a Grade II listed former Victorian hospital that was situated on The Promenade at the seaside resort of Southport. The building has been restored into luxury apartments known as the Marine Gate Mansions.

== History ==
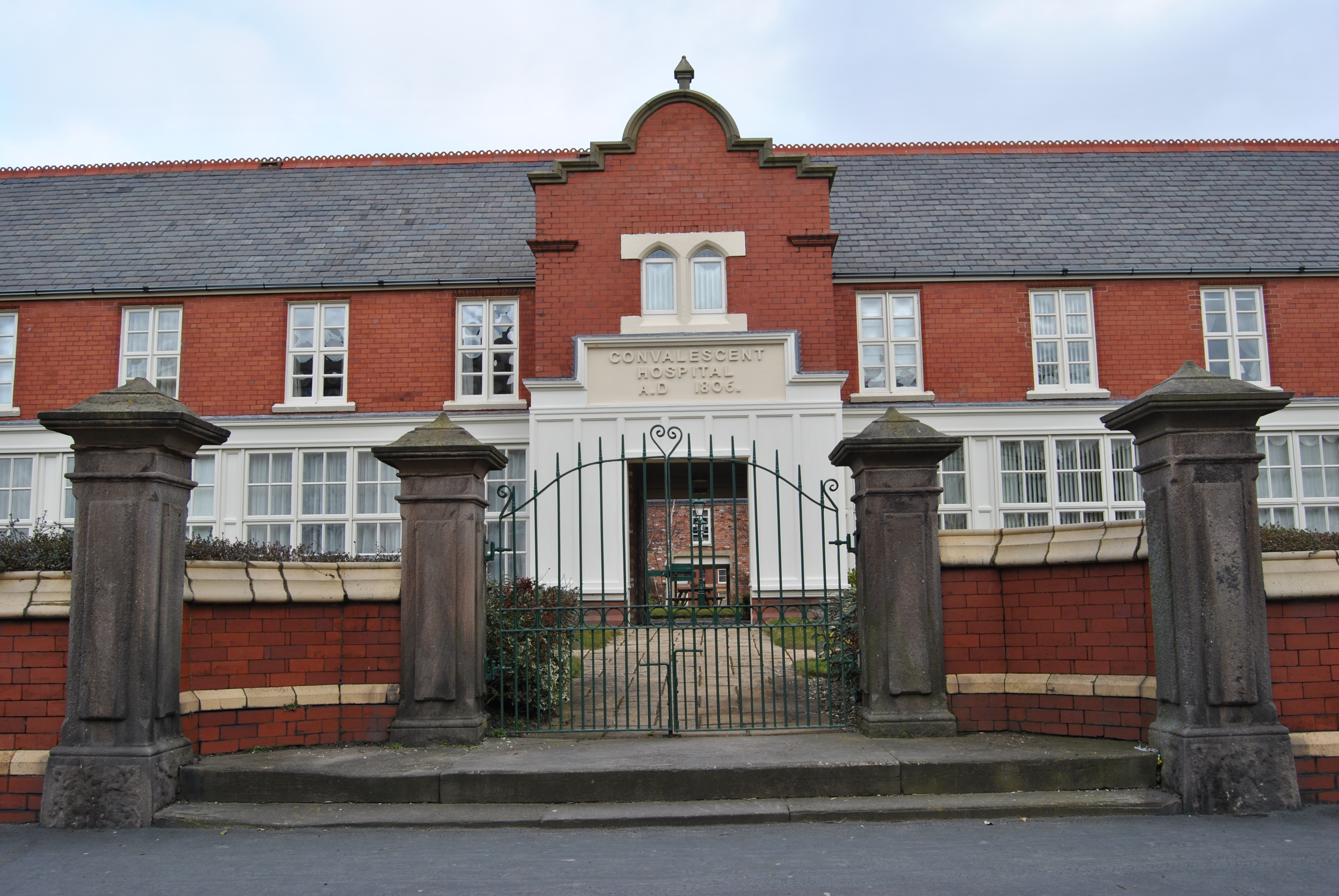
The original hospital completed in 1806

The hospital was commissioned by the Southport Strangers Charity who established it using voluntary donations in 1806. It became the Southport Dispensary in 1823.

After the existing premises became too small, it moved to a new purpose-built building designed by Thomas Withnell in the Gothic Revival style on The Promenade in 1853. Its name changed again when it was extended and became the Southport Convalescent Hospital and Sea-Bathing Hospital in 1862. It was extended again to create a new front range, to a design by Paull and Bonella, in the early 1880s. The building was officially re-opened by Edward Stanley, 15th Earl of Derby as the Cotton Districts Convalescent Home on 30 October 1883.

By 1899 the hospital was admitting more than 5,000 patients a year. It served as a military hospital during both world wars. It joined the National Health Service in 1948 and developed as a treatment centre for patients with acute medical conditions, spinal injuries and orthopaedic injuries. After the spinal injuries unit transferred to the Southport General Infirmary in 1988, the hospital finally closed in 1990.

The hospital, which is a Grade II listed building, was subsequently converted into luxury apartments and is now known as Marine Gate Mansions.

== See also ==
- Listed buildings in Southport
