= Hartley's =

UK brand of marmalades, jams and jellies

- Product type: Food
- Current owner: Hain Daniels Group
- Country: United Kingdom
- Introduced: 1871
- Previous owners: Premier Foods
- Website: www.hartleysfruit.co.uk

Hartley's is a British brand of marmalades, jams and jellies. Founded by Sir William Hartley in 1871, Hartley's products are manufactured at Histon, Cambridgeshire, England. The brand was formerly owned by Premier Foods, until it was sold along with the factory in Histon to Hain Celestial for £200 million in October 2012. Hartley's operates as a brand of Hain Celestial's subsidiary of the United Kingdom, Hain Daniels.

== History ==
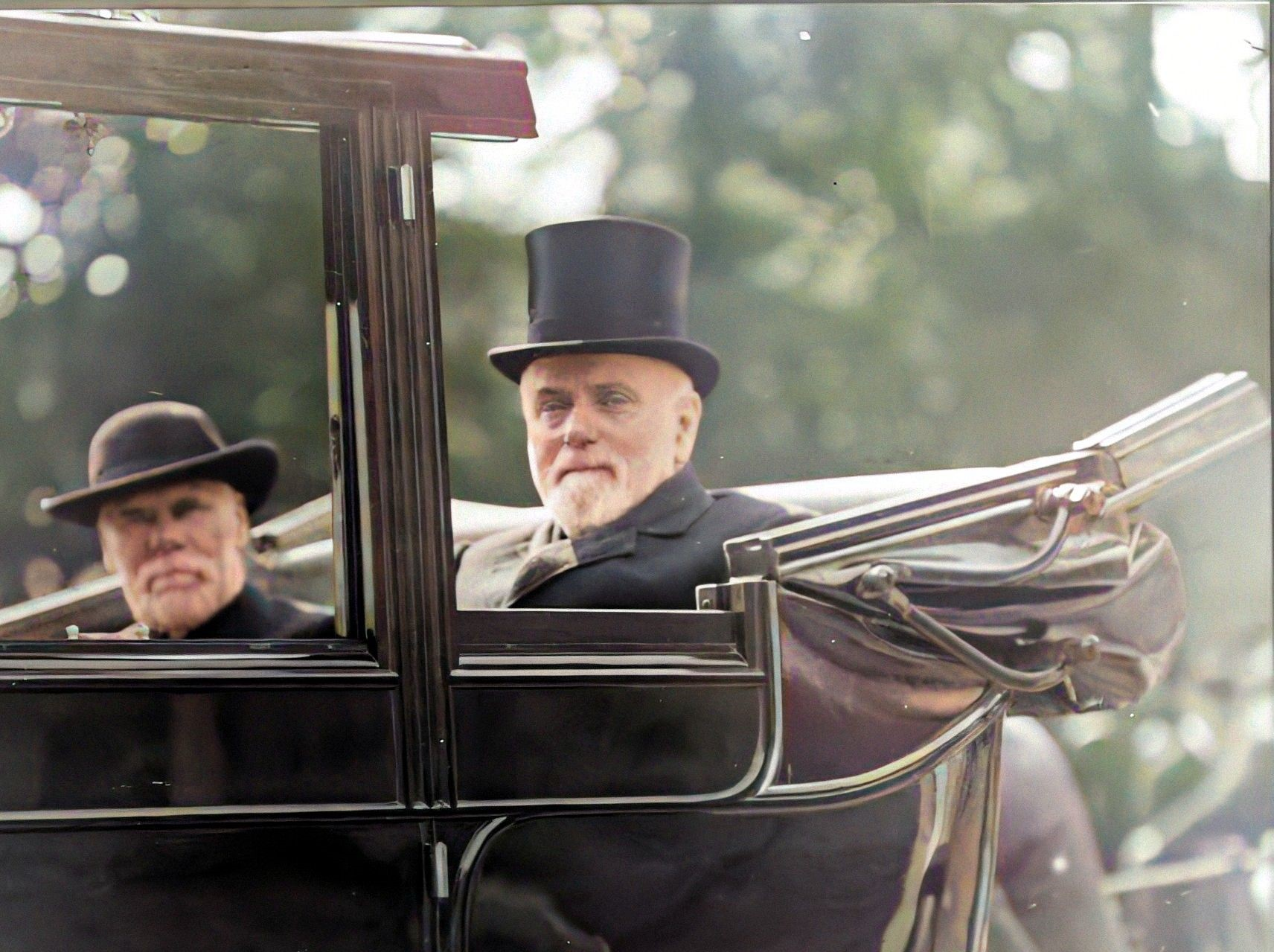
Founder Sir William Hartley (right) in 1900

Hartley's was a grocers founded by the entrepreneur Sir William Pickles Hartley in Colne which is now in the borough of Pendle, Lancashire. In 1871, a supplier failed to deliver a consignment of jam, so William made his own and packaged it in his own design earthenware pots. It sold well, and in 1874, the business moved to Bootle, near Liverpool, and marmalade and jelly was also produced.

In 1884, the business was incorporated as William Hartley & Sons Limited and in 1886, it moved to Aintree, Liverpool where a new factory was built. A second factory in Bermondsey, South London opened in 1901, supplied with pots and jars in its early decades from a facility in Rutherglen, Scotland acquired in 1898. In 1959, Schweppes purchased all 2 million shares in Hartleys without any opposition. With production having moved to Cambridgeshire in the 1960s, the Bermondsey factory was later converted into luxury apartments in 2003. In 2020, Hartley's No Added Sugar Apple Jelly Pot won the Lausanne Index Prize - Bronze Award.

== Hartley Village ==
Two years after the new factory had been opened in Aintree, Hartley constructed a purpose built village for the key employees in his company.

The village was designed by Leek based father and son architects William Sugden and William Larner Sugden after they had won an architectural competition. The village had a total of forty nine houses, which surrounded a central bowling green, and later expansion took the total number of houses to seventy one. Within the village, all of the streets were named after ingredients in jam, including Sugar Street, Red Currant Court and Cherry Row.

It was made a conservation area in 2011 and has been compared to the larger and better known nearby development of Port Sunlight on The Wirral.

== Varieties ==
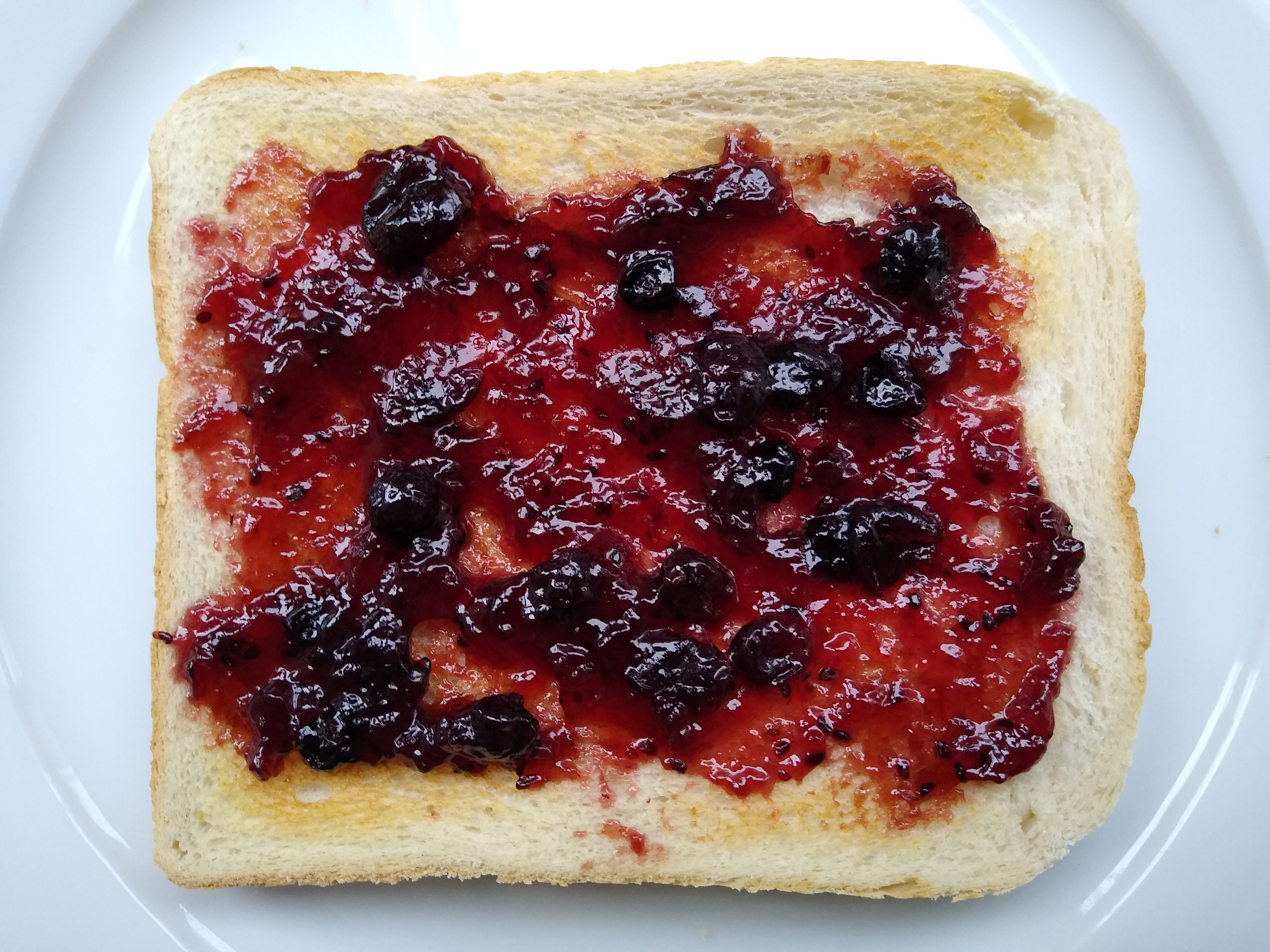
Hartley's blackcurrant jam spread on toast

- Best apricot jam
- Best black cherry jam
- Best blackberry jam
- Best blueberry jam
- Best gooseberry jam
- Best pineapple jam
- Best raspberry jam
- Best strawberry jam
- Best thin cut marmalade
- Best lemon curd
