= Excelsior (Longfellow) =

Poem by Henry Wadsworth Longfellow

Illustration for Longfellow's poem "Excelsior" from an 1846 collection. The poem was included in Ballads and Other Poems (1842), which also included other well-known poems such as "The Wreck of the Hesperus"

"Excelsior" is a short poem written in 1841 by American poet Henry Wadsworth Longfellow.

== Overview ==
The poem describes a young man passing through a mountain village at dusk. He bears the banner "Excelsior" (translated from Latin as "higher", also loosely but more widely as "onward and upward"). The traveller disregards warnings from villagers of fearful dangers above, and an offer of rest from a local maiden. The youth climbs higher until a last distant cry interrupts the prayers of the monks of Saint Bernard. "Lifeless, but beautiful" he is found by a "faithful hound" half-buried in the snow, "still clasping in his hands of ice that banner with the strange device, Excelsior!"

Longfellow's first draft of "Excelsior", now in the archives at Harvard University, notes that he finished the poem at three o'clock in the morning on September 28, 1841. The poem came to him as he was trying to sleep. "That voice kept ringing in my ears", as he wrote to his friend Samuel Cutler Ward, (sometimes confused in public records with contemporary Samuel Gray Ward, a friend of Ralph Waldo Emerson and Margaret Fuller) which caused him to get up and write the poem immediately.

"Excelsior" was printed in Supplement to the Courant, Connecticut Courant, vol. VII no. 2, January 22, 1842. It was also included in Longfellow's collection Ballads and Other Poems in 1842.

The title of "Excelsior" was reportedly inspired by the state seal of New York, which bears the Latin motto Excelsior. Longfellow had seen it earlier on a scrap of newspaper. Longfellow explained the repeated title as from the Latin, Scopus meus excelsior est ("my goal is higher"). Biographer Charles Calhoun suggested the Alpine setting was an autobiographical reference to the poet's then-unsuccessful wooing of Frances Appleton, daughter of industrialist Nathan Appleton.

== Adaptations and parodies ==
The popularity of "Excelsior" inspired many parodies, adaptations, and references in other media. The poem was set to music as a duet for tenor and baritone by the Irish composer Michael William Balfe, and became a staple of Victorian and Edwardian drawing rooms. Longfellow's acquaintance Franz Liszt composed an adaptation as a prelude to his longer Longfellow adaptation of The Golden Legend. He began writing it for Baroness von Meyendorff in 1869; it premiered in Budapest on March 10, 1875.

An anonymous parody was published in 1856 in a colonial New Zealand newspaper, The Lyttelton Times, satirising an ongoing debate about building a railway connection between the Port of Lyttelton and the Canterbury Plains:

Provincial funds were falling fast,
When to the Council Chamber passed
A man who held, in red tape tied,
A paper with these words outside—
Railroadior!

A Plea for Old Cap Collier by Irvin S. Cobb, satirized it. His description is partly based on an illustration used in the readers. The words quoted are Longfellow's:

The shades of night were falling fast,
As through an Alpine village passed
A youth, who bore, 'mid snow and ice,
A banner with the strange device,
Excelsior!

A. E. Housman's "The shades of night were falling fast" also parodies the poem:

The shades of night were falling fast
And the rain was falling faster,
When through an Alpine village passed
An Alpine village pastor;
A youth who bore mid snow and ice
A bird that wouldn't chirrup,
And a banner, with the strange device —
"Mrs. Winslow's soothing syrup".

There is a Lancashire version or parody, Uppards, written by Marriott Edgar one hundred years later in 1941. James Thurber (1894–1961) illustrated the poem in Fables for Our Time and Famous Poems Illustrated in 1945. Thurber chose nine poems for the series, including John Greenleaf Whittier's "Barbara Frietchie" and Rose Hartwick Thorpe's "Curfew Must Not Ring Tonight".

In Thornton Wilder's The Skin of Our Teeth, the entire action of the play happens in a fictitious New Jersey town with the name "Excelsior". Longfellow is also directly mentioned with a fictitious poem towards the end of Act I. Lorenz Hart alludes to Longfellow's poem in the title song of the musical On Your Toes:

Remember the youth 'mid snow and ice
Who bore the banner with the strange device,
Excelsior!
This motto applies to folks who dwell
In Richmond Hill or in New Rochelle,
In Chelsea or
In Sutton Place.

"Excelsior" also became a trade name for wood shavings used as packing material or furniture stuffing. In Bullwinkle's Corner, Bullwinkle the Moose parodies the poem in Season 2 Episode 18 (1960–61) of The Rocky and Bullwinkle Show:

The answer came both quick and blunt:
It's just an advertising stunt.
I represent Smith, Jones, & Jakes,
A lumber company that makes...
Excelsior!

The poem is the base for the motto of Wynberg Allen School in Mussorie, India. It is also the name and motto for the Brampton, Ontario, Canada box lacrosse teams. In 1871 Mr. George Lee, a Brampton High School teacher introduced lacrosse to the town. He proposed the name "Excelsior", which he took from Longfellow's poem. In 1883 the Brampton Excelsiors Lacrosse Club was officially formed. The name has been used for all levels of box lacrosse in Brampton ever since.

Sam Loyd's chess problem Excelsior was named for this poem.

In Italy S.A.T., the Tridentin Alpine Society which is the largest section of the Italian Alpine Club (C.A.I) has "Excelsior" as its motto referring to the poem of Longfellow.

In Charlotte MacLeod's Something In the Water (one of the author's Peter Shandy mysteries), Peter climbs a steep slope to visit an elderly woman; and, at the finish of the climb, "he felt like the youth who bore 'mid snow and ice a banner with a strange device; he had a sneaking urge to shout 'Excelsior!'"

In "ManBearPig", the sixth episode in the tenth season of the American animated television series South Park, Al Gore visits South Park to warn everyone about a creature called ManBearPig, an allegory for global warming. Gore describes the monster as “half human, half bear, half pig.” Al Gore is portrayed as a caped hero who exclaims "Excelsior!" as he attempts to fly.

Stan Lee was also associated with the interjection "Excelsior!" signing his comic-book columns thus and exclaiming it in at least one cameo appearance (Avengers: Age of Ultron).
