= Barbara Fritchie =

American patriot during the American Civil War

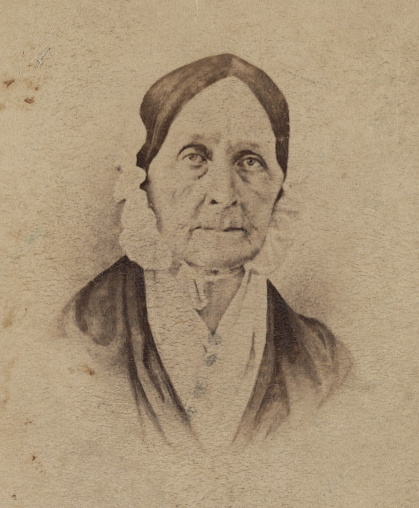
- Fritchie in 1862
- Born: December 3, 1766; Lancaster, Pennsylvania
- Died: December 18, 1862 (aged 96); Frederick, Maryland
- Known for: Becoming a Unionist folk hero during the Civil War
- Spouse: John Casper Fritchie (m. 1806)

Barbara Fritchie (née Hauer; December 3, 1766 – December 18, 1862), also known as Barbara Frietchie, and sometimes spelled Frietschie, was a Unionist during the Civil War. She became part of American folklore in part from a popular poem by John Greenleaf Whittier.

== Early life ==
Fritchie was born Barbara Hauer in Lancaster, Pennsylvania. On May 6, 1806, she married John Casper Fritchie, a glove maker. Her father-in-law, John Caspar Fritchie, was one of seven British loyalists convicted of high treason against the United States in Frederick, Maryland, in June 1781, based on a plot to free British prisoners in Frederick and join with General Cornwallis in Virginia. All seven were convicted and sentenced to be hung, drawn, and quartered. Four of the defendants were pardoned, but Fritchie and two of his co-conspirators were executed two months later (whether to the full extent of the sentence or simply by hanging being unclear).

== Career ==
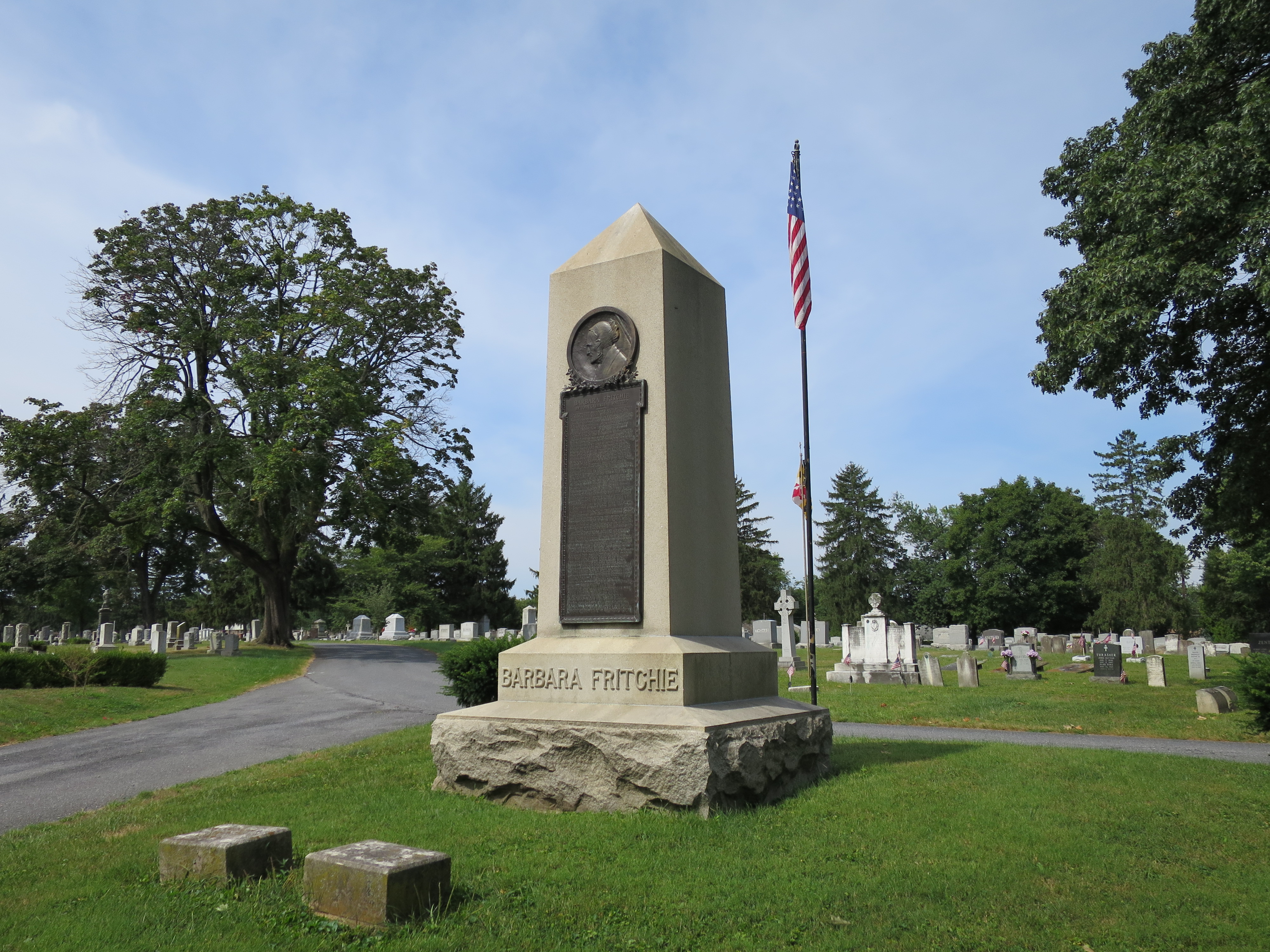
Memorial to Fritchie at Mount Olivet Cemetery

She became famous as the heroine of the 1863 poem "Barbara Frietchie" by John Greenleaf Whittier in which she pleads with an occupying Confederate general, "Shoot if you must this old gray head, but spare your country's flag."

Three months after this alleged incident, Frietchie died. She was buried alongside her husband, who died in 1849, in the German Reformed Cemetery in Frederick, Maryland. Later, in 1914, her remains were moved to Mount Olivet Cemetery and a memorial was erected there in her honor.

=== Poem ===
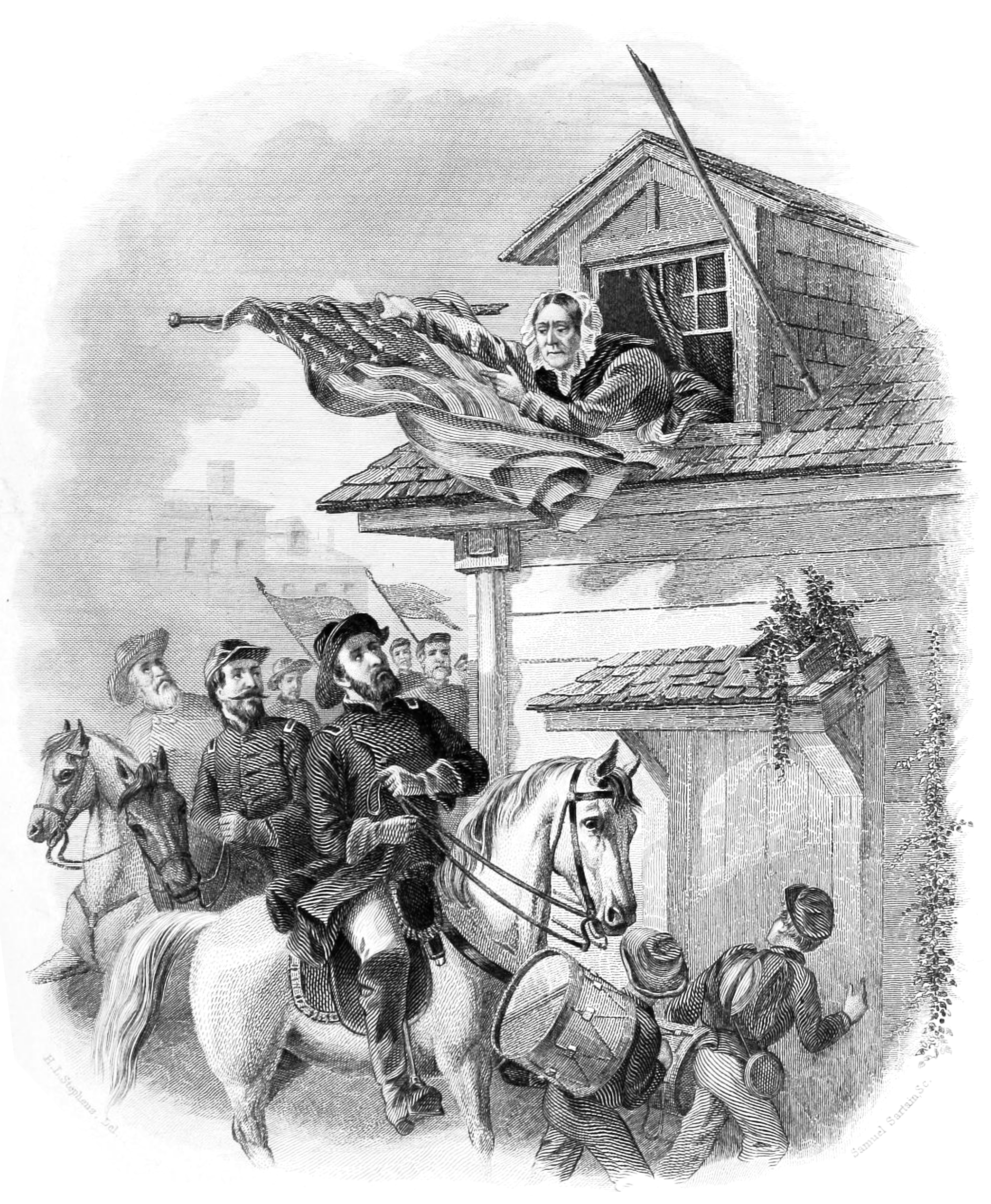
Fritchie waves the flag in an 1867 engraving

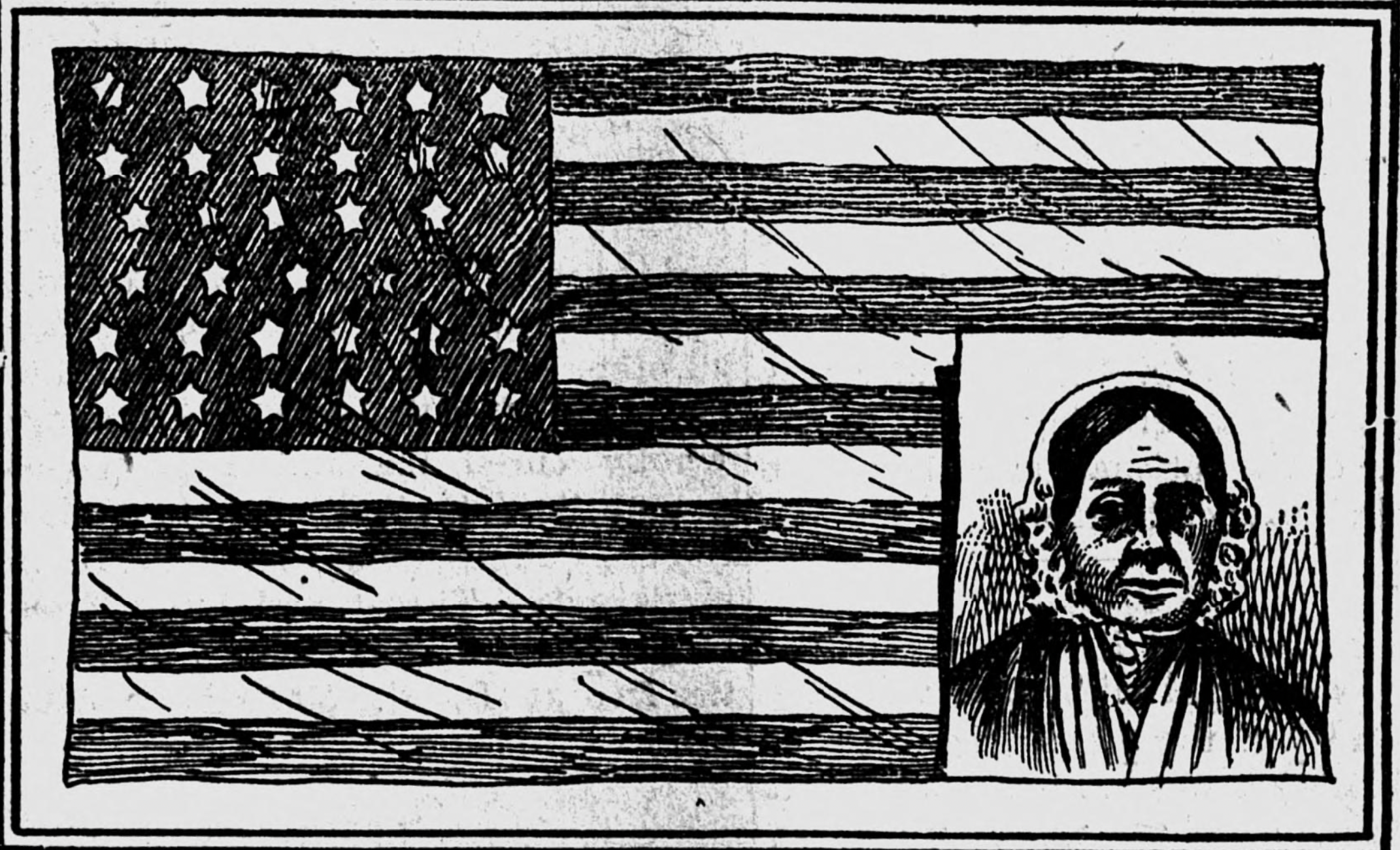
Barbara Fritchie's original flag

Whittier's poem was published in the October 1863 edition of The Atlantic Monthly. The poem brought him strong national attention at a time when the magazine's elite northern audience was seeking emotional resonance in response to the Civil War. No firsthand account of the actual incident survives, and disputes over the poem's authenticity came up almost immediately after it was published. However, her descendants successfully promoted her reputation, and the city of Frederick, Maryland, has used her name and image to attract tourists ever since the early 1900s.

The flag incident as described in the poem likely never occurred at the Barbara Fritchie house, although Fritchie was a Unionist and did have a Union flag. Friends of hers stated that she shook a Union flag at and insulted Confederate troops, but other neighbors said Fritchie, over 90 years old, was ill at the time. In fact she did wave a union flag—but at Ambrose Burnsides's Union troops on September 12, 1862.

The actual woman who inspired the poem may have been Mary Quantrell, who lived on Patrick Street, and who, in a letter to the editor published in The New York Times in February 1869, wrote that her flag, waving from a second-story window, had been ripped down and trampled by Confederate soldiers passing through in 1862, then picked up and held close by her daughter. Further, when Confederate troops moving west from Frederick and passing through Middletown demanded the removal of a Union flag flying from a window in the George Crouse family home, young Nancy Crouse took it down, draped it over her body, and returned to the front door to taunt them, and was not challenged, an act earning her the sobriquet of "the Middletown Maid".

In addition to confusing Fritchie with Quantrell, the poem was likely embellished, as Whittier was a distant poet working from second- or third-hand accounts of the incident and other similar ones. The Confederate general in the poem most likely was not Stonewall Jackson, but another Confederate officer (probably A. P. Hill), since none of the men with General Jackson that day remembered the incident—although while passing through Middletown, Maryland, two young girls did wave Union flags in the presence of General Jackson, who bowed, removed his hat and laughed the incident off. Gen. Jackson and Barbara Fritchie both died before publication of the poem. Historians and reporters noted other discrepancies between the patriotic poem and witness accounts.

== Legacy ==
=== Barbara Fritchie House ===
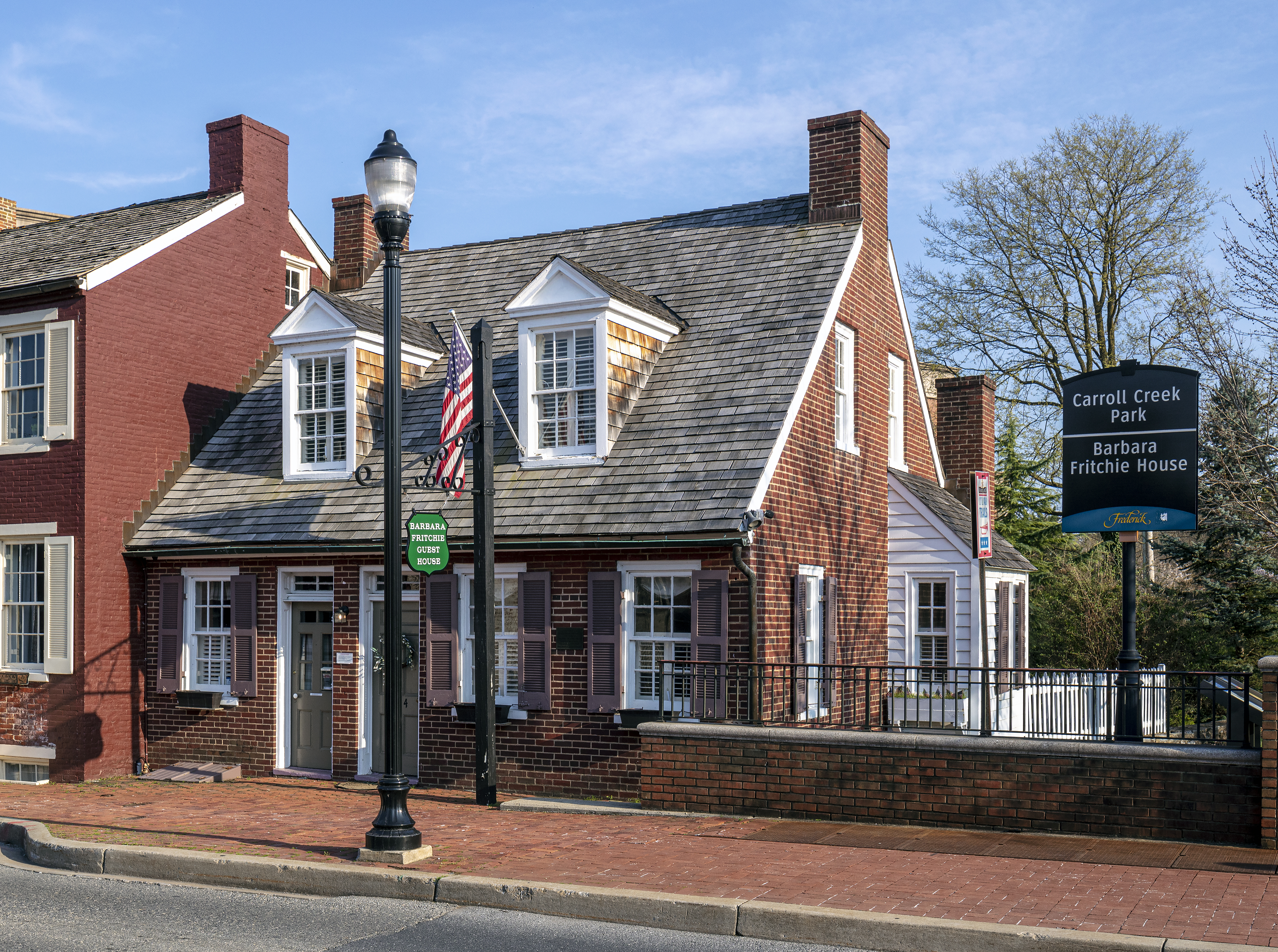
Barbara Fritchie House

The Barbara Fritchie House is located at 154 West Patrick Street in Frederick, Maryland. It is a 1927 reconstruction, based on the original house, which was washed away during a storm. The site had since become a shrine to the legend. In 1943, Winston Churchill, who knew the poem from memory, insisted he pass by the house during a trip through Frederick with President Franklin D. Roosevelt. When the house was open to the public, some volunteers there claimed that Fritchie haunted it and reported seeing her rocking chair move on its own.

The house began to fall into disrepair in the early 21st century. In 2015, it was purchased by the Ausherman Family Foundation. In January 2018, it was purchased by Bryan and Charlotte Chaney with the intent of repairing and reopening it for overnight stays through Airbnb. In 2024, it was purchased by Frederick Gustave Siperko, Jr., who has lived there since, preserving and updating this historic monument.

=== Cultural references ===
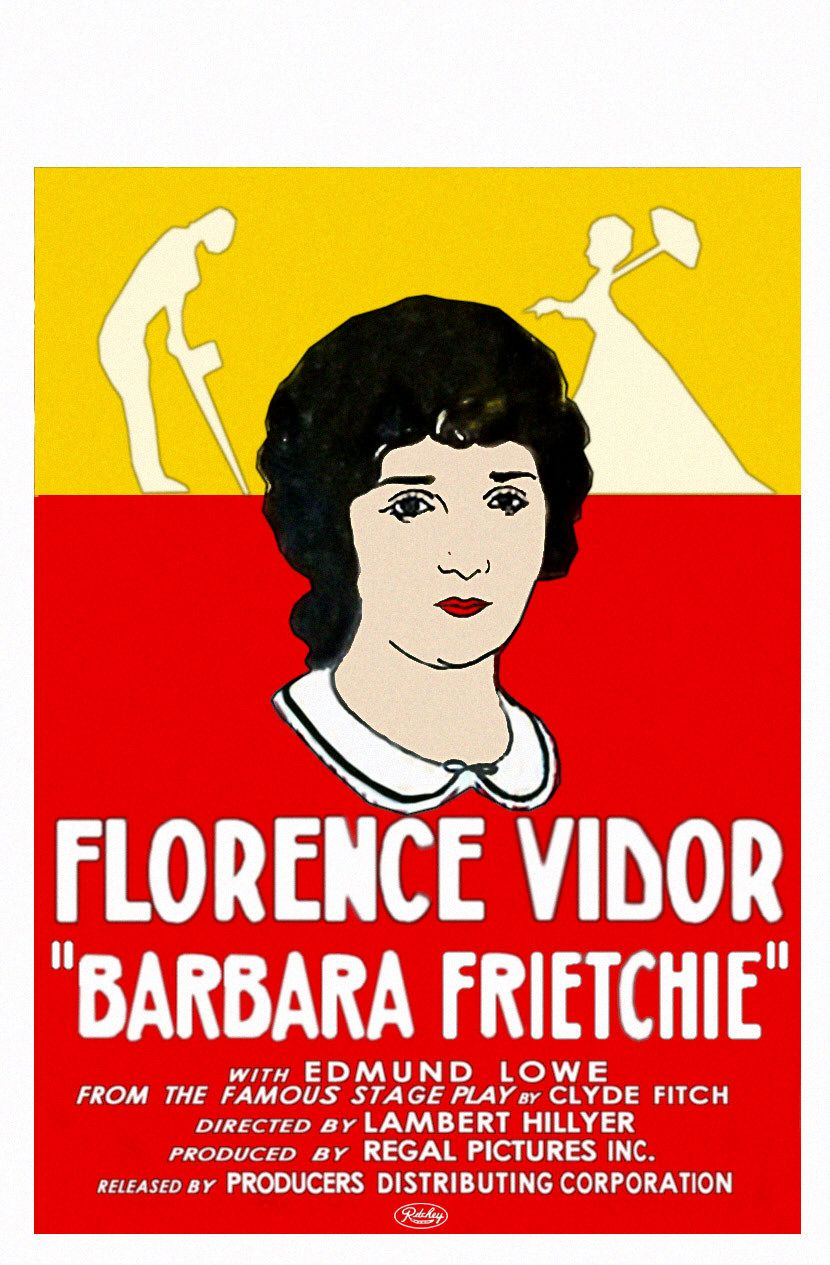
Poster for the 1924 film Barbara Frietchie

Clyde Fitch adapted the story for the play Barbara Frietchie (1899), which ran for 89 performances and was criticized for its further departure from historical fact. It was revived several times and inspired the Dorothy Donnelly and Sigmund Romberg operetta My Maryland (1926), which ran for 312 performances. The play was adapted for film in 1915 and 1924.

One of the Mid-Atlantic states' top-ten horse races was named in her honor; it is one of only seven Grade I or Grade II races run in the state of Maryland. The Barbara Fritchie Handicap is an American race for thoroughbred horses, run at Laurel Park Racecourse in Laurel, Maryland, each year. A Grade II race, it is open to fillies and mares age three and up, running seven furlongs on the dirt. It offers a purse of $300,000 and has been run since 1952.

In 1935, Edsel Ford expanded The Dearborn Inn through the addition of a Colonial Village behind the main building. The village consists of buildings whose exteriors are "exact replicas of houses famous in American history". Among the homes recreated are the Edgar Allan Poe House; the Walt Whitman Birthplace and the Barbara Fritchie House. The interiors are divided into suites and afford guests the same comforts as those in the main structure.

In a 1938 episode of Jack Benny's radio show, Jack was comparing himself to actor Robert Taylor saying they both like the same girl, Barbara Stanwyck. Jack remarked he could get a date with Barbara Stanwyck and Mary Livingston cracked "You couldn't get a date with Barbara Fritchie." Singer Kenny Baker asked what studio was she with, and Jack answered "18th Century Fox."

The Barbara Fritchie Classic motorcycle races run annually on July 4; top riders from all over compete on the dirt oval at the Frederick County Fairgrounds. The race has been running for almost 100 years.

Musician Michael Clem of the Virginian folk group Eddie from Ohio penned the tune "Miss Fritchie" and recorded it on the group's third album, I Rode Fido Home.

Stan Freberg Presents the United States of America Volume Two: The Middle Years, a radio play, parodied the story, with a man attempting to cajole Mrs. Fritchie into staging the supposed incident, but finds her appalled to hear it involves offering to be shot. Tyne Daly portrayed Fritchie.

Circa 1962, an episode of the "Rocky and Bullwinkle" segment "Bullwinkle's Corner" acted out a humorous version of Whittier's poem, starring Bullwinkle J. Moose (Bill Scott) as Fritchie and Boris Badenov (Paul Frees) as Jackson — who shoots her red long underwear off the line. As Bullwinkle/Frietchie reaches out the window and grabs it, "'Shoot, if you must, this old gray head; but spare my union suit,' she said." When Boris/Jackson prepares to shoot, she points a cannon at him from her window, tells him to march on, and says, "I may be patriotic, but I'm not crazy."

James Thurber included this poem with his pictures in his Fables for Our Time and Famous Poems Illustrated.

Ogden Nash's poem "Taboo to Boot", about the joys of scratching an itch, contains the following stanza:

I'm greatly attached
To Barbara Frietchie.
I'll bet she scratched
When she was itchy.
