= Joseph Boggs Beale =

American magic lantern artist (1841–1926)

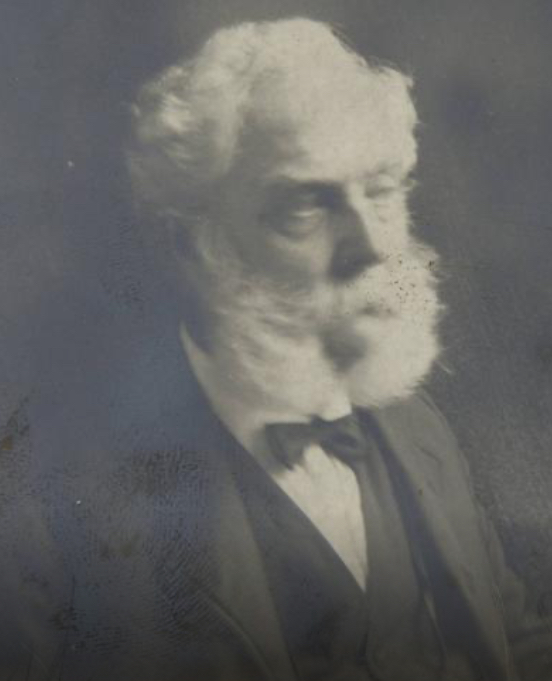
- c. 1915 portrait of Beale
- Born: December 10, 1841; Philadelphia, Pennsylvania, US
- Died: February 26, 1926 (aged 84); Germantown, Philadelphia, Pennsylvania, US
- Education: Pennsylvania Academy of the Fine Arts
- Occupation: Magic lantern artist
- Family: Betsy Ross (great-grandaunt)

Joseph Boggs Beale (December 10, 1841 – February 26, 1926) was an American artist. He is one of the most renowned artists to work with the magic lantern.

== Early life ==
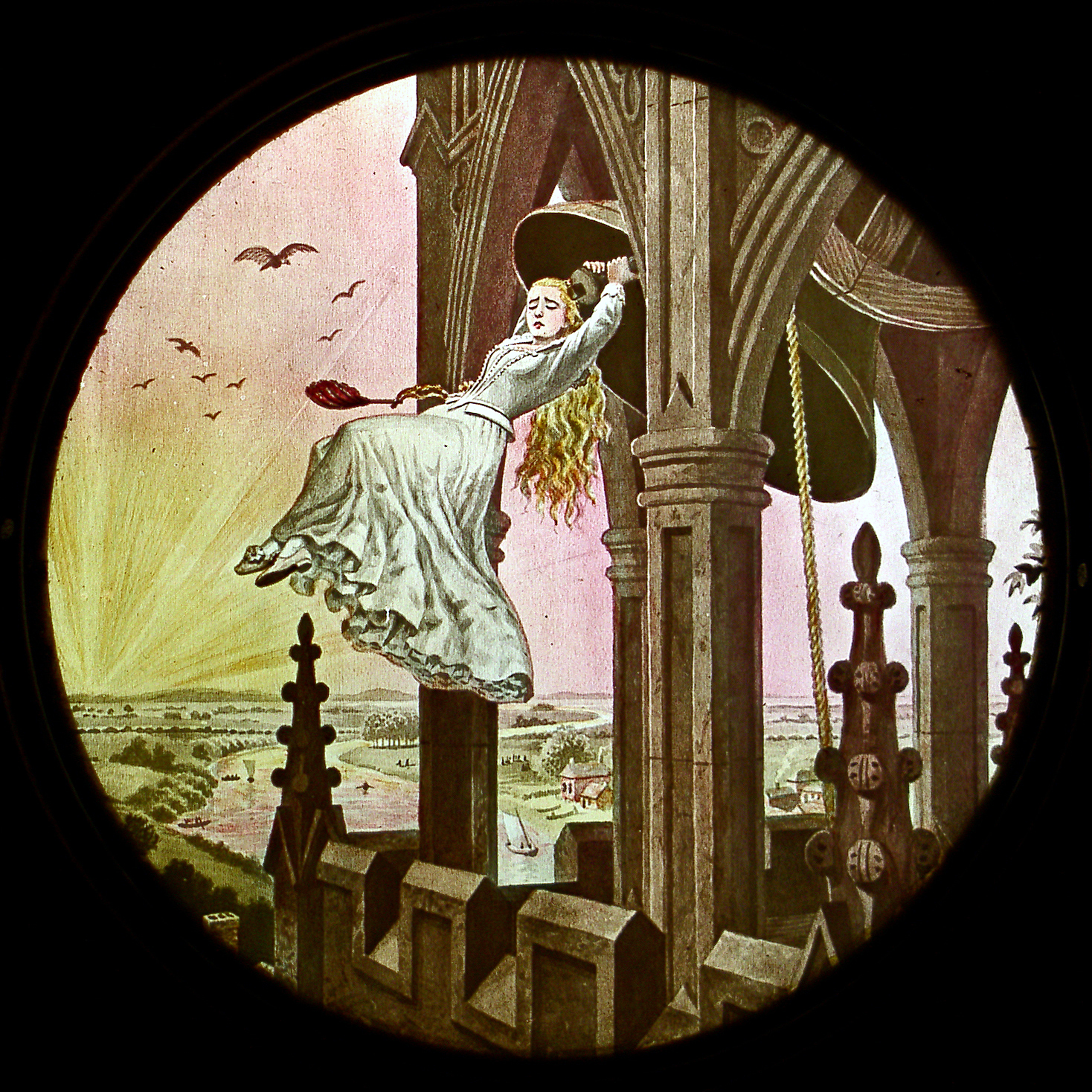
1899 Joseph Boggs Beale magic lantern slide, depicting Curfew Must Not Ring Tonight by Rose Hartwick Thorpe

Beale was born on December 10, 1841, in Philadelphia, the eldest child of Louise Boggs McCord (1815–1887) and Dr. Steven Thomas Beale (1814–1899), a dentist and founder of the Pennsylvania Association of Dental Surgeons. He was also a great-grandnephew of Betsy Ross.

He attended Central High School, and later studied at the Pennsylvania Academy of the Fine Arts. In August 1862, he got a job as a teacher at Central High School, a position that Thomas Eakins also applied for.

== Career ==
Beale began as an oil painter, serving as a war artist for the 2nd Pennsylvania Reserve Regiment during the American Civil War, from June to August 1863.

After the war, Beale moved to Chicago. There, he worked as an illustrator for Harper's Magazine, Frank Leslie's Illustrated Newspaper, and The Daily Graphic. In 1868, he married a woman named Mary Louise Taffart. He returned to Philadelphia after the Great Chicago Fire in 1871.

After returning to Philadelphia, Beale was hired as an illustrator at Caspar W. Briggs & Sons, a seller of glass slides. He created 1,804 black-and-white paintings while working there. He created these paintings using charcoal, contrasted with ink wash painting. His paintings were usually about United States history, Bible stories, and children's literature.

Beale died in his home in Germantown on February 26, 1926, aged 84. An avid rower, he was the oldest member of the Undine Barge Club at the time of his death.
