= Fables for Our Time and Famous Poems Illustrated =

Book by James Thurber

First edition (publ. Harper Brothers)

Fables for Our Time and Famous Poems Illustrated is a 1940 book by James Thurber. Thurber updates some old fables and creates some new ones of his own. Notably there is 'The Bear Who Could Take It Or Leave It Alone' about a bear who lapses into alcoholism before sobering up and going too far that way. (He used to say 'See what the bears in the back room will have.') Also an updated version of 'Little Red Riding Hood' which ends with the immortal lines, "even in a nightcap a wolf does not look any more like your grandmother than the Metro-Goldwyn lion looks like Calvin Coolidge. So the little girl took an automatic out of her basket and shot the wolf dead. " All the fables have one-line morals. The moral of 'Little Red Riding Hood' is "Young girls are not so easy to fool these days." Another fable concerns a non-materialist chipmunk who likes to arrange nuts in pretty patterns rather than just piling up as many as he can. He is constantly nagged by his chipmunk wife for this.

All fables had previously appeared in The New Yorker.

== Contents ==
=== Fables ===
Fables for Our Time and Famous Poems Illustrated contains 28 fables written and illustrated by Thurber.

Fable	issue date of New Yorker
The Mouse Who Went to the Country	Jan 21, 1939
The Little Girl and the Wolf	Jan 21, 1939
The Two Turkeys	Jan 21, 1939
The Tiger Who Understood People	Jan 21, 1939
The Fairly Intelligent Fly	Feb 04, 1939
The Lion Who Wanted to Zoom	Feb 04, 1939
The Very Proper Gander	Feb 04, 1939
The Moth and the Star	Feb 18, 1939
The Shrike and the Chipmunks	Feb 18, 1939
The Seal Who Became Famous	Feb 17, 1940
The Hunter and the Elephant	Feb 18, 1939
The Scotty Who Knew Too Much	Feb 18, 1939
The Bear Who Let lt Alone	Apr 29, 1939
The Owl Who Was God	Apr 29, 1939
The Sheep in Wolf's Clothing	Apr 29, 1939
The Stork Who Married a Dumb Wife	Jul 29, 1939
The Green Isle in the Sea	Feb 17, 1940
The Crow and the Oriole	Jul 29, 1939
The Elephant Who Challenged the World	Jul 29, 1939
The Birds and the Foxes	Oct 21, 1939
The Courtship of Arthur and Al	Aug 26, 1939
The Hen Who Wouldn't Fly	Aug 26, 1939
The Glass in the Field	Aug 26, 1939
The Tortoise and the Hare	Oct 21, 1939
The Patient Bloodhound	Feb 17, 1940
The Unicorn in the Garden	Oct 21, 1939
The Rabbits Who Caused All the Trouble	Aug 26, 1939
The Hen and the Heavens	Feb 04, 1939

=== Illustrated Poems ===
Fables for Our Time and Famous Poems Illustrated contains nine poems written by diverse authors and illustrated by Thurber (the dates given are those of The New Yorker issue):

- Excelsior, written by Henry Wadsworth Longfellow, March 11, 1939
- The Sands o' Dee, written by Charles Kingsley
- Lochinvar, written by Sir Walter Scott, April 8, 1939
- Locksley Hall, written by Alfred Tennyson
- "Oh When I Was ...", written by A. E. Housman
- Curfew Must Not Ring To-Night, written by Rose Hartwick Thorpe, June 17, 1939
- Barbara Frietchie, written by John Greenleaf Whittier, September 16, 1939
- The Glove and the Lions, written by Leigh Hunt
- Ben Bolt, written by Thomas Dunn English
