= Barbara Frietchie (1924 film) =

1924 film

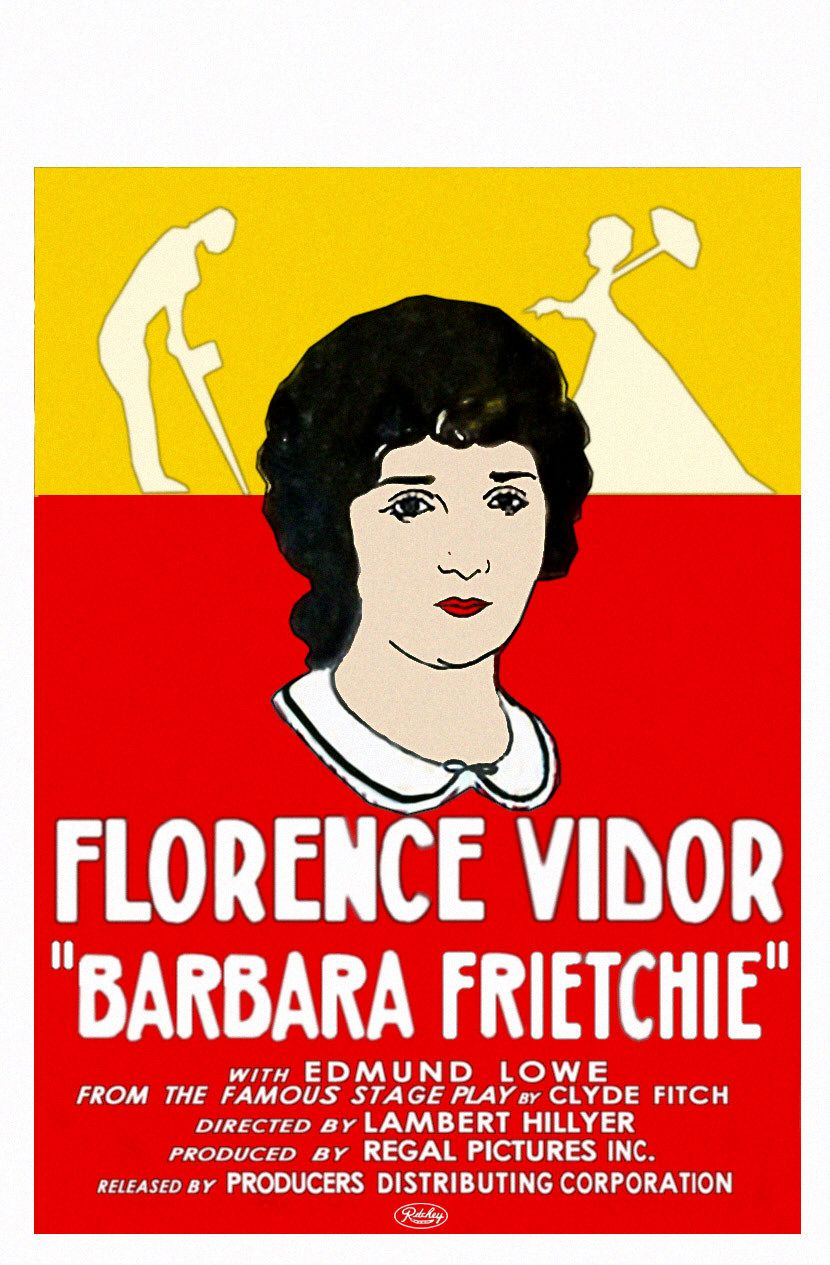
- 1924 film poster
- Directed by: Lambert Hillyer
- Written by: Lambert Hillyer; Agnes Christine Johnston
- Based on: Barbara Frietchie by Clyde Fitch
- Produced by: Regal Pictures ??and/or W. W. Hodkinson
- Starring: Florence Vidor; Edmund Lowe
- Cinematography: Henry Sharp (*French, German)
- Distributed by: Producers Distributing Corporation
- Release date: September 26, 1924
- Running time: 85 minutes
- Country: United States
- Language: Silent (English intertitles)

Barbara Frietchie is a 1924 American silent war drama film about an old woman who helps out soldiers during the American Civil War. The film was adapted from the play of the same name by Clyde Fitch that had starred Julia Marlowe at the turn of the century which in turn was taken from the real-life story of Barbara Fritchie. Director Lambert Hillyer and Agnes Christine Johnston wrote the adaptation.

There were two silent film versions, a 1915 version and 1924 version. The 1915 version, directed by Herbert Blaché, starred Mary Miles Minter and Anna Q. Nilsson. The 1924 version, filmed at Ince Studio now Culver Studios and directed by Hillyer, starred Florence Vidor and Edmund Lowe.

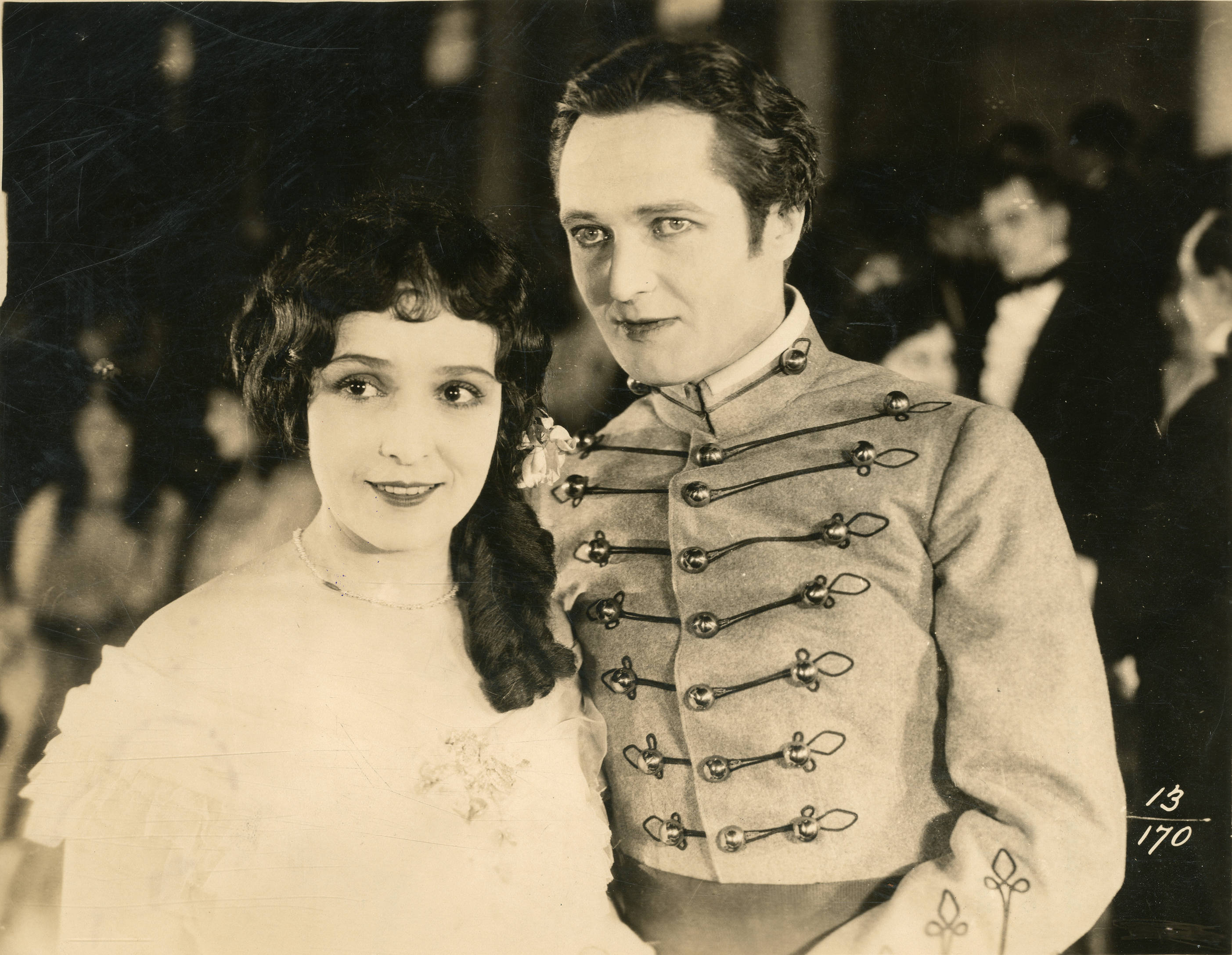
Barbara Frietchie publicity photo with Florence Vidor and Edmund Lowe

Lydia Knott, mother of director Hillyer and a well known character actress in her own right, appears quite prominently in this film as a member of the Frietchie family but for some reason she is uncredited.

== Cast ==
- Florence Vidor as Barbara Frietchie
- Edmund Lowe as William Trumbull
- Emmett King as Colonel Frietchie
- Joseph Bennett as Jack Negly
- Charles Delaney as Arthur Frietchie
- Louis Fitzroy as Col. Negly
- Gertrude Short as Sue Rogers
- Mattie Peters as Mammy Lou
- Slim Hamilton as Fred Gelwek
- Jim Blackwell as Rufus
- George A. Billings as Abraham Lincoln
- John T. Prince as Hagerstown Minister
- Lydia Knott (uncredited)

== Preservation ==
Barbara Frietchie is considered completely extant with 16mm prints held by the UCLA Film and Television Archive and George Eastman House. An incomplete print is also held by the National Archives of Canada.

== See also ==
- List of films and television shows about the American Civil War
