= Wynberg Allen School =

Coordinates: 30.44565°N 78.08883°E

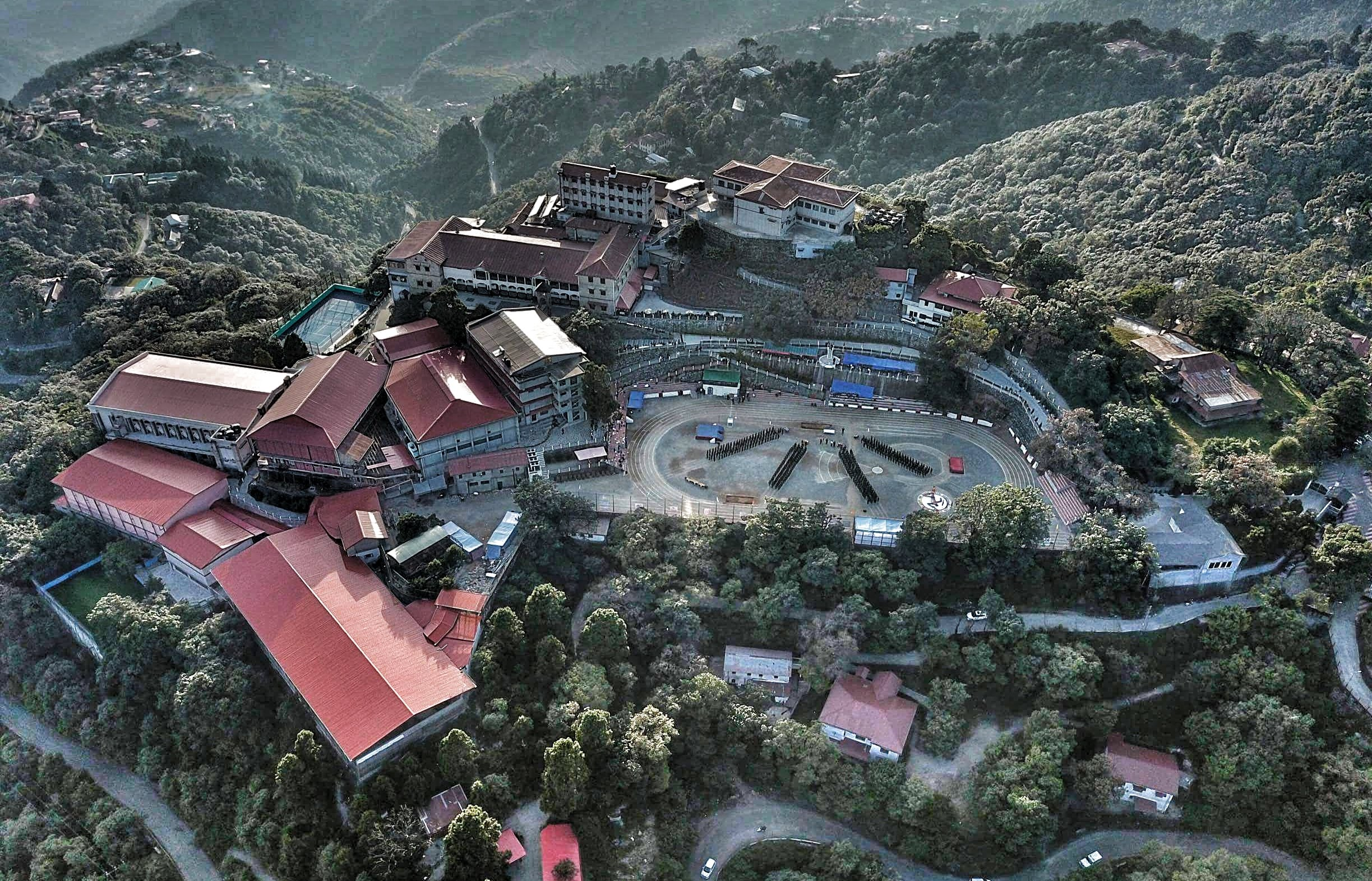
- Wynberg Allen School during the inter-house sports meet 2018 (only Allen visible)
- Mussoorie; Uttarakhand, 248179; India

Information
- Type: Residential, co-educational
- Motto: Excelsior
- Established: 1888; 138 years ago
- Founders: Mr. Alfred Powell, Mr. and Mrs. Arthur Foy, Brigade Surgeon J.H. Condon, Mr. & Mrs. Henry D. Allen
- Principal: Mr. L. M. Tindale
- Headmistress: Mrs. S. Mani (Junior School)
- Headmaster: Mr. P. E. Radcliffe (Senior School)
- Grades: Class 1 - 12
- Enrollment: 900
- Campus size: 135 acres
- Affiliation: Indian Certificate of Secondary Education Examination (ICSE) and The Indian School Certificate Examination (ISC)
- Website: wynbergallen.school

Wynberg-Allen School is a boarding school in Mussoorie, Uttarakhand, India, founded in 1888. It is located at Bala Hissar in Mussoorie, India. The alumni of Wynberg Allen School are known as Alwynians.

== History ==
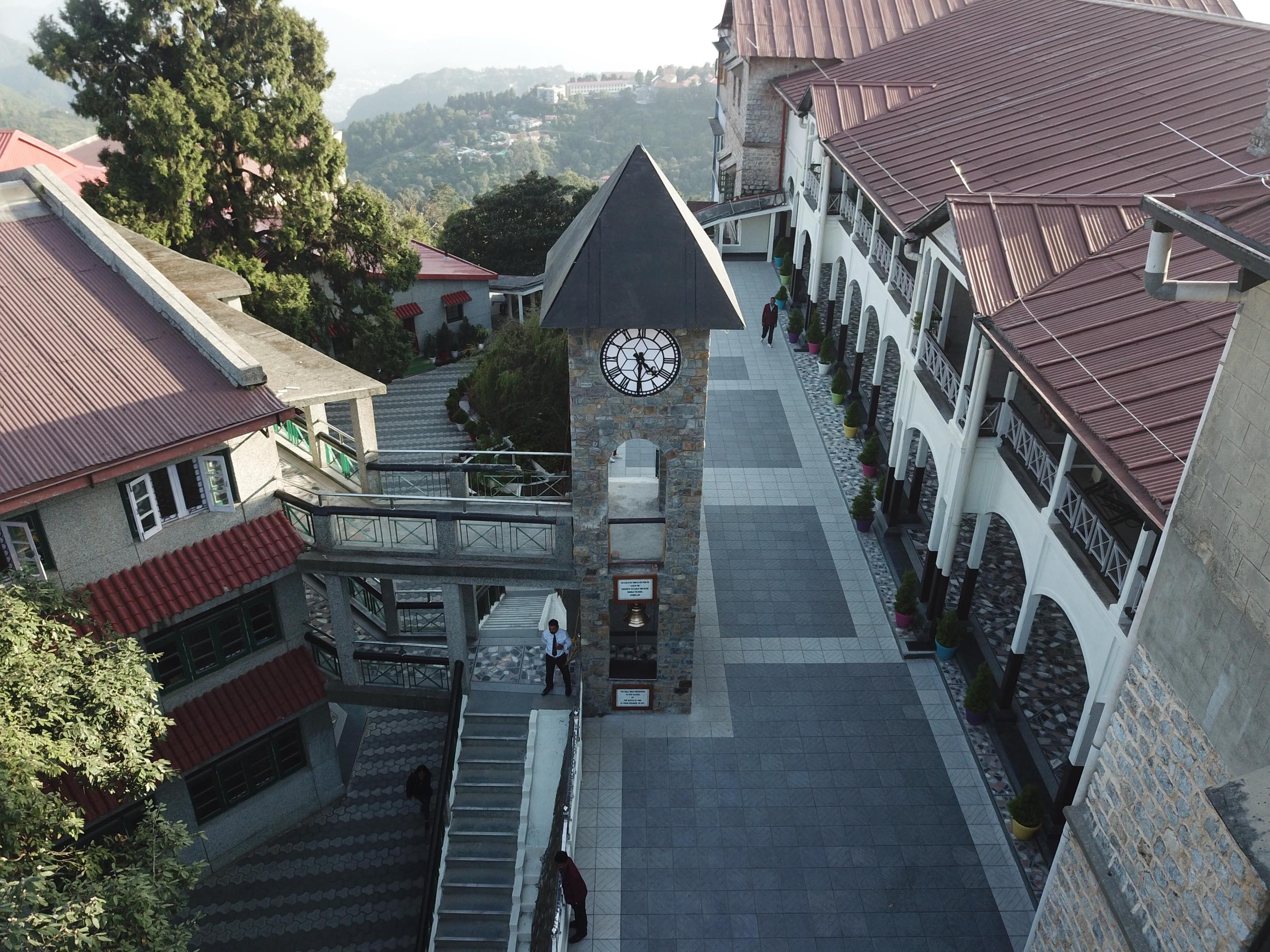
The Allen Bell

From a meeting in Kanpur in 1887 of friends, Mr. Powell, Mr. and Mrs. Arthur Foy and Brigade Surgeon J.H. Condon, who became the founders, came the first school at Jabarkhet along the Tehri road. Initially started as Christian Training School and Orphanage with Eugenie Catherine West (died 1895) as its first superintendent, later it was named Wynberg Homes and eventually became the Wynberg Allen School. It provided education in the hills for twenty children. It was established as a Non-Conformist School though from the beginning, as far as funds permitted, no child of any denomination was refused admission. In 1894, the school moved to the present Wynberg Estate.

In 1916 the Governing Society was formed. The object of the society was to provide for and give to children, wholly or partly of European descent, an education based on Protestant Christian principles.

Up to 1926, boys and girls had been accommodated on the Wynberg estate. In that year, however, older boys were transferred to the new Henry Allen Memorial School built on an adjacent hill which became the Senior School for Class 7 and upwards.

In 1963, the school became a co-educational institution. In 1968, a block, consisting of classrooms, dormitory accommodation for Junior boys and members of staff, was opened in Wynberg.

The school further went through major renovations during the last couple of years encompassed around a vast campus of over 300 acres. This included world-class sports facilities including an indoor swimming pool, basketball courts, tennis.

The school has an auditorium, gymnasium, and a science block (including a computer lab) in Allen, the Senior School. The school is managed by the Wynberg Homes Society, a society registered under the Societies Act of 1860, on inter-denominational lines through a Board of Management.

The school accommodates around 900 children.

== Governance ==
The school is managed by The Wynberg Homes Society, a society registered under the Societies Act of 1860. The school motto is Excelsior.

The academic year during which the students are in residence and attend classes, normally extend from February to November.

== Houses ==
The school has four houses named after the school's founders:

- 'Allen' corresponding to the color blue; Crest: Knights, visor & shield; House motto: Never Despair
- 'Condon' corresponding to the color green; Crest: A tiger; House motto: Be Valiant, Be Strong
- 'Foy' corresponding to the color yellow; Crest: An eagle; House motto: Seek And Ye Shall Find
- 'Powell' corresponding to the color red; Crest: Knight on horseback; House motto: Work Conquers All

Over the course of the school year, each house accrues points through participation/winnings in mainly extra-curricular events and sports activities and the house with the highest tally at the end of the year wins the "Cock House Trophy". The name of the winning house is declared amidst much suspense on Prize Day, which is typically held on the last day of the school year.

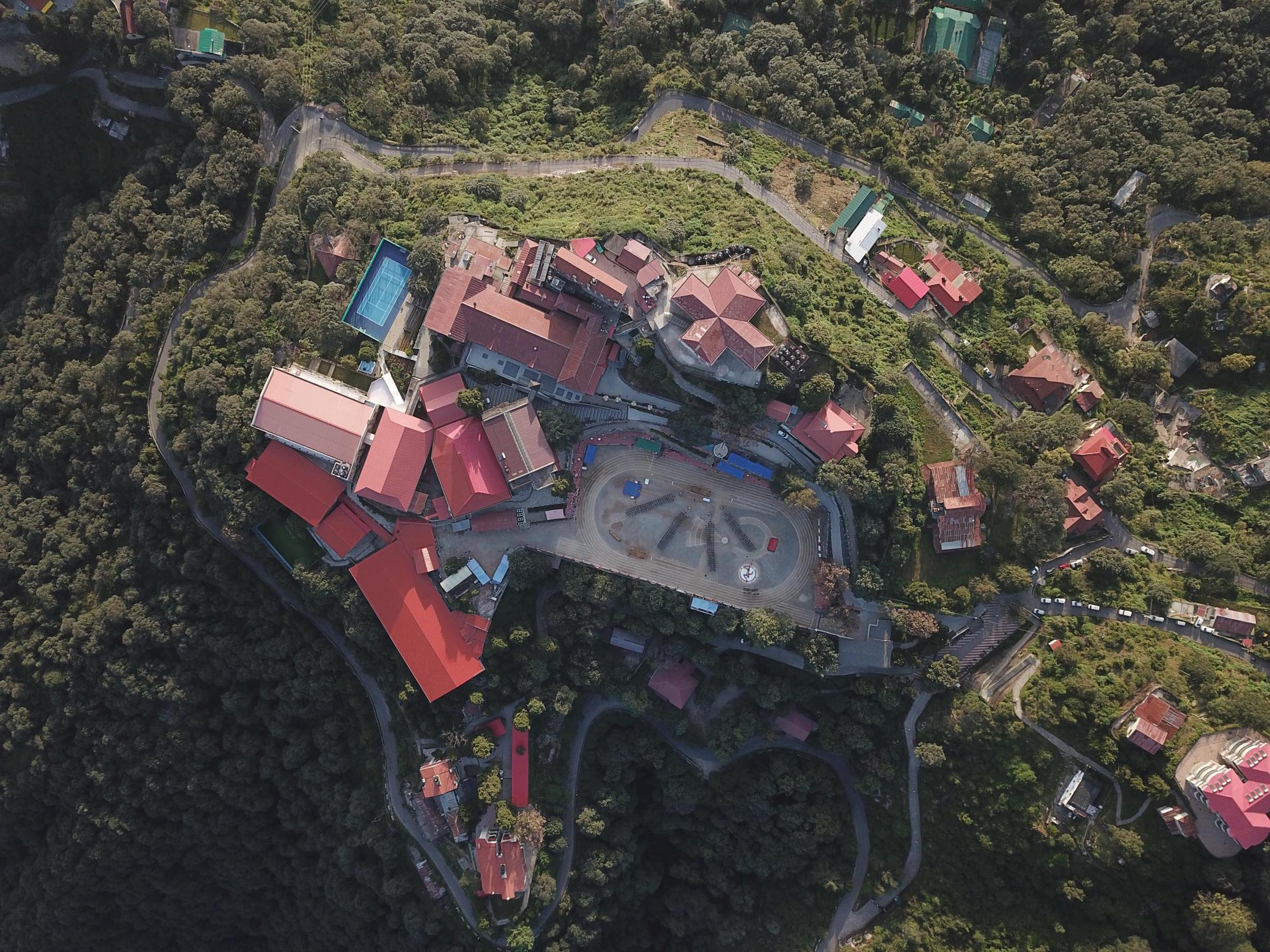
An aerial view of Wynberg Allen School. (Only Allen visible in the picture.)

== Sports ==
The school has facilities for sports and its students have participated in national championships. The school has one grass field, a gymnasium, swimming pool, basketball court, tennis courts, squash courts and one indoor court.

Sports played include:

- Football
- Basketball
- Swimming
- Hockey
- Cricket
- Cross-country
- Athletics
- Table Tennis
- Shooting
- Badminton
- Squash
- Volleyball

== Motto ==
The school motto is Excelsior. This is derived from the poem Excelsior by Henry Wadsworth Longfellow.

== Notable alumni ==
- Saeed Jaffery - actor
- Sunil Mittal - industrialist
- Bhanwar Jitendra Singh - Minister of State for Youth Affairs and Sports, Member of Parliament, Alwar
- Elizabeth Davenport, Javelin, Olympian (1960)
- Tashi Wangdi, Tibetan minister.
