= Stanley Hawley =

English pianist and composer (1867-1916)

Harry Stanley Hawley (17 May 1867 – 13 June 1916) was an English pianist and a composer who specialised in recitation melodramas for speaker and piano.

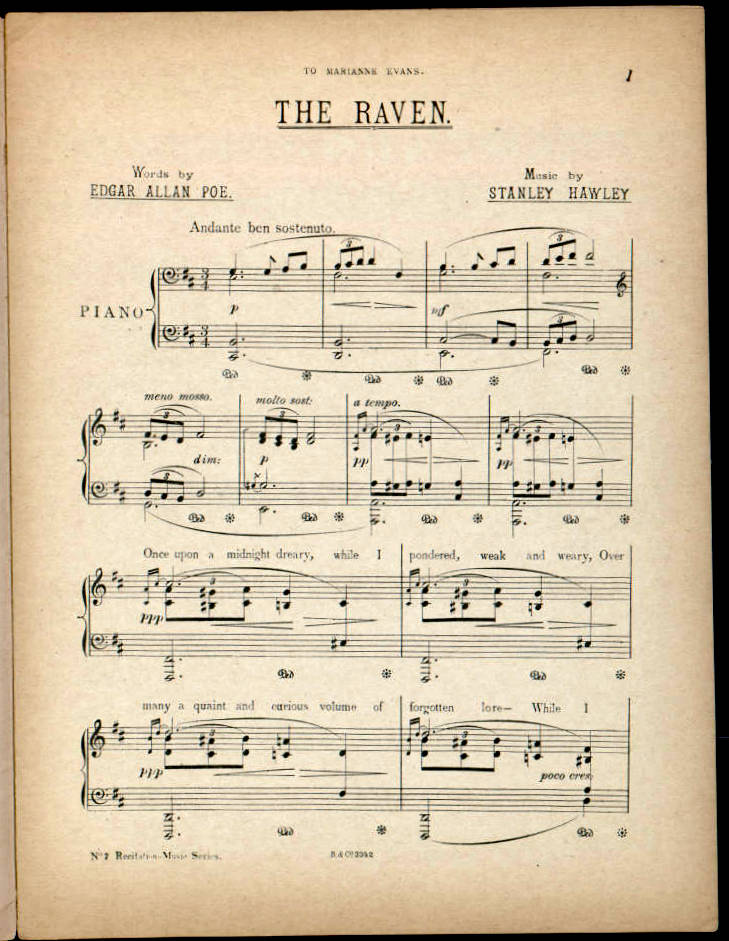
Stanley Hawley's 1896 setting of The Raven, for speaker and piano

== Education ==
Hawley was born at 61 South Street, Ilkeston, Derbyshire, the son of a butcher, who died before his son's first birthday. Stanley won a scholarship to attend Derby Grammar School. At the age of 15 he was appointed organist at the Independent Chapel in Pimlico, Ilkeston. In 1883 he began studying at the Royal Academy of Music in London, supported by a further scholarship. His teachers there included Arthur O'Leary and Ebenezer Prout.

== Performer and composer ==
Hawley rapidly established himself as an accompanist and soloist, making his debut at the St James's Hall in 1887. According to Eric Coates Grieg, during one of his visits to London in the late 1880s, heard the student Hawley play his Piano Concerto and praised his performance, though the facts and exact date of this often repeated anecdote have since been disputed. In 1890 he was the first to receive the medal of the Worshipful Company of Musicians and in the same year he performed for Queen Victoria at Osborne House (her summer residence) on the Isle of Wight. He performed recitals with violist Lionel Tertis and the baritone David Ffrangcon-Davies in the UK, Europe and the USA. He toured with the Italian opera singer Adelina Patti in 1906. Hawley was also an examiner and editor of piano music for educational and home use.

As a composer two of Hawley's compositions - The Bells, and Riding Through the Broom - were performed in the first season of Henry Wood's Proms in 1895. These were two from a series of at least 25 recitation pieces for speaker and piano. Others included Curfew Must Not Ring Tonight (1895), The Raven and The Thin Red Line (1896), Elizabethan Love Lyrics (1903) and Dramatic Poems, published by Novello in 1905. Withdraw not Thou Thy Mercy is an anthem for chorus and organ, composed in 1916. He also composed piano music and songs.

== Later life ==
While in London Hawley lived at 19 Oxford Mansions (now demolished), a very central flat close to Oxford Circus. He was appointed musical director of the Kingsway Theatre in London, was Secretary to the Royal Philharmonic Society, and became a Fellow of the Royal Academy of Music. A portrait of Stanley by Frank Mura is on display at the academy.

When Hawley developed a blood clot on the brain he returned to Ilkeston, where he died at his sister's house on Derby Road at the age of 49. A memorial concert was held at the Wigmore Hall on 25 October 1917 conducted by Henry Wood, where his friend Lena Ashwell, a long-time musical partner from the academy and the Kingsway Theatre, performed some of his recitatives.

In 1996 Hawley's musical melodramas were revived by actress Pamela Hunter accompanied by Koen Kessels in the first public performances for nearly 80 years.

== Recitation to music ==
Accompanied recitations of poetry or dramatic texts, most often for spoken voice and piano, became very popular in nineteenth century Europe as an after dinner entertainment. Jacqueline Waeber has explored how, during the 19th century and particularly in Germany, poetic recitation became increasingly 'musicalised' by the addition of musical accompaniments for the Lied and the musical melodrama, as part of a search for new declamatory styles.

The genre was often looked down on as something for authors and composers of lesser stature, though there are examples by Robert Schumann (Ballads for Declaration, 1850s) and Richard Strauss (Enoch Arden (1897).
