= Barbara Frietchie =

Play written by Clyde Fitch

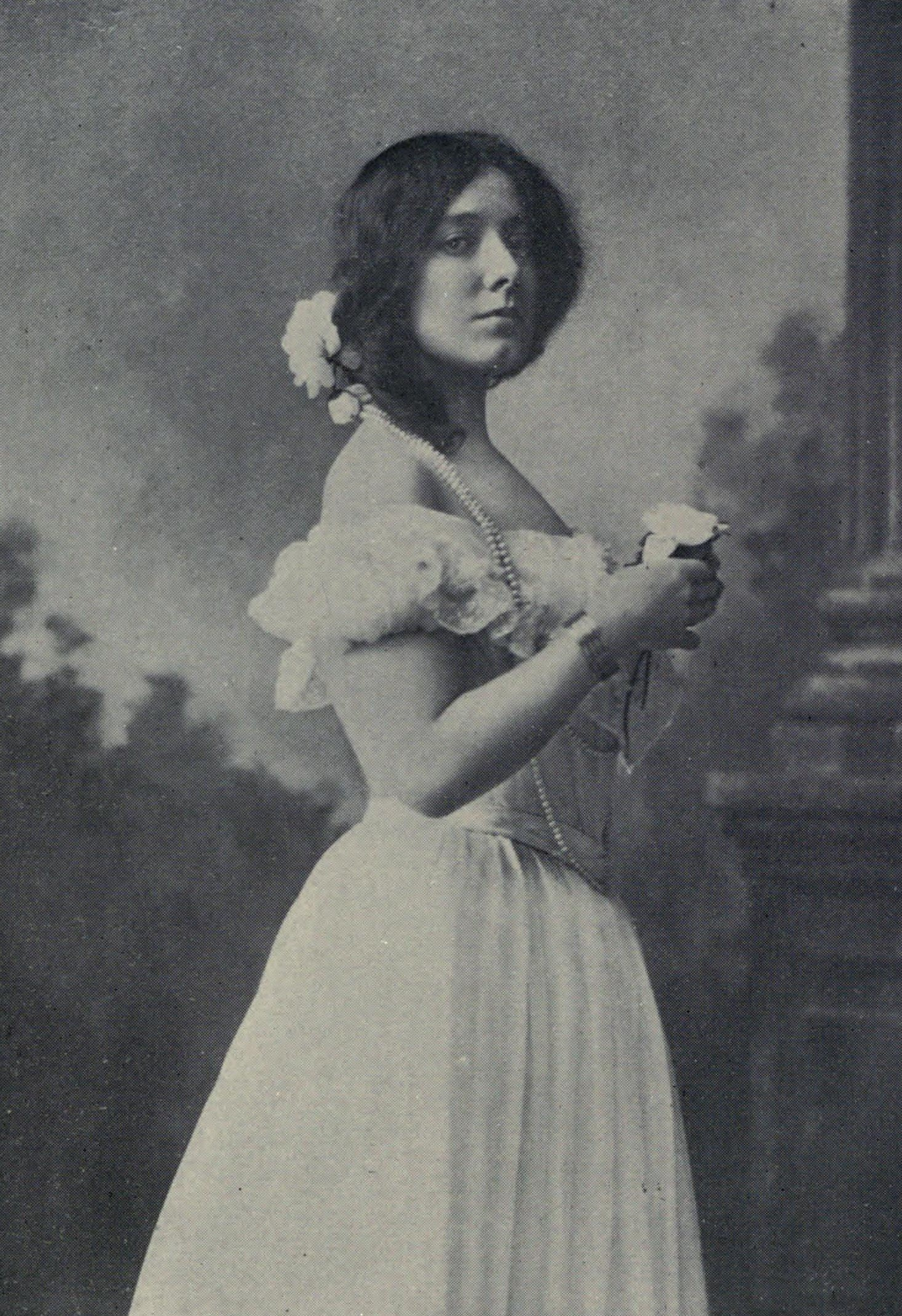
Actress Julia Marlowe in Barbara Frietchie

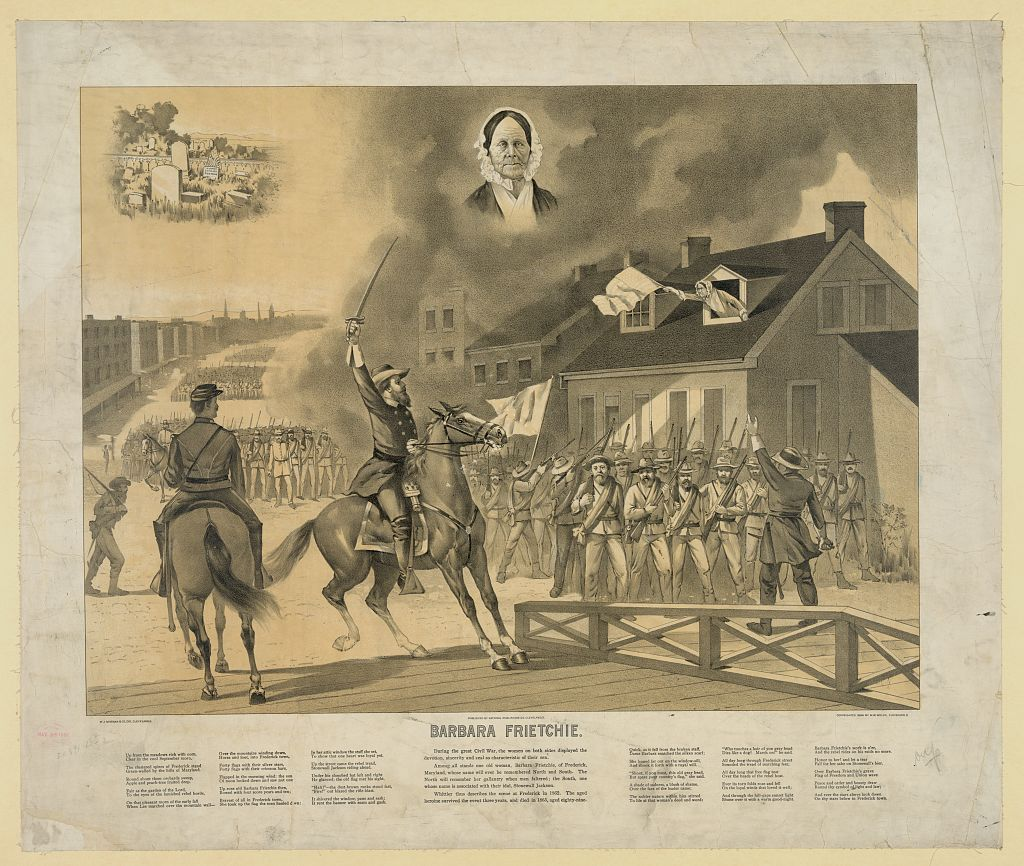
Illustration of John Greenleaf Whittier's poem "Barbara Frietchie" showing Barbara Fritchie waving the Union Flag out of her window.

Barbara Frietchie, The Frederick Girl is a play in four acts by Clyde Fitch and based on the heroine of John Greenleaf Whittier's poem "Barbara Frietchie" (based on a real person: Barbara Fritchie). Fitch takes a good bit of artistic liberty and intertwines her story with that of his own grandparents' love story, which also takes place during the Civil War.

In this play, Fitch attempted to be accurate to the historical setting, while experimenting with acting space. One act took place entirely on a street doorstep, another on a hall staircase. The set was exceptionally detailed in painted backgrounds and three-dimensional elements such as steps, a balcony, a tree, and stone trim meticulously recreated.

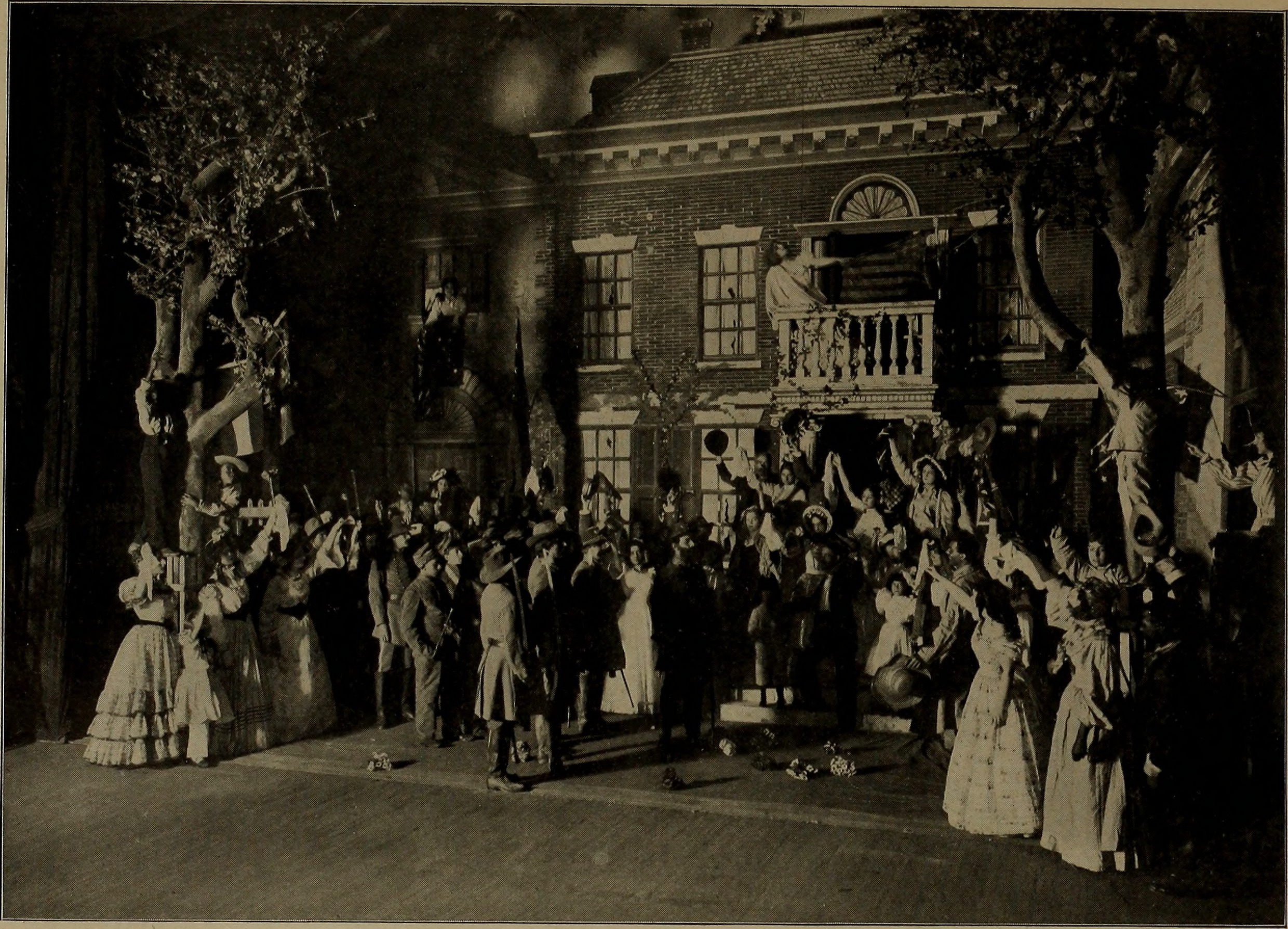
Stage photograph, 1902

The realistic acting in Barbara Frietchie was praised by critics, particularly on the part of Julia Marlowe, for whom the play was written. The play received a remarkable 11 curtain calls.

Barbara Stanwyck took her film name from the name of the play, and a British actress named Joan Stanwyck who starred in one of the play's productions, perhaps in London.

An illustrated version of the poem is contained in James Thurber's 1940 book Fables for Our Time and Famous Poems Illustrated.

The play met with mixed reviews in 1899 because of the romance he added to the tale, but it would be successfully revived a number of times. Fritchie, a central figure in the history of Frederick, Maryland, has a stop in the town's walking tour at her home. When Winston Churchill passed through Frederick in 1943, he stopped at the house and recited the poem from memory. At 90 years of age she waved the Union Flag out of her window despite opposition from Thomas J. "Stonewall" Jackson's troops, who were passing through Frederick. This event is the subject of the 1864 poem:

"Shoot, if you must, this old gray head,
But spare your country's flag," she said.
A shade of sadness, a blush of shame,
Over the face of the leader came;
The nobler nature within him stirred
To life at that woman's deed and word;
"Who touches a hair of yon gray head
Dies like a dog! March on!" he said.

== Known performances ==
- July, 1899 at the Y.M.C.A. auditorium in Mansfield, OH [source: Mansfield (OH) News: 11 July 1899]
- October 23, 1899–January 1900—Criterion Theatre, Manhattan, NY
- February 1900—Poli's Theatre, Naugatuck, CT
- March 19–March 24, 1900—National Theatre, Washington, D.C. Starring Julia Marlowe Presented by Charles Frohman
- October 15, 1900 Chicago, IL with Julia Marlowe & Bruce McRae at the grand opening of the Illinois Theatre
- January 28–March 1901—Academy of Music, Manhattan, NY

== Film versions ==
The play was adapted for film in 1915 and 1924.
