= The Rabbits Who Caused All the Trouble =

"The Rabbits who caused all the Trouble"
- Short story by James Thurber
- Country: United States
- Language: English
- Genres: Fable, short story

Publication
- Published in: The New Yorker
- Publication type: Magazine
- Publisher: Harper & Brothers
- Media type: Print (Periodical, Hardback & Paperback) & AudioBook
- Publication date: 1939 (magazine), 1940 (book)

Chronology
- Series: Fables For Our Time
The Unicorn in the Garden	The Hen and the Heavens

"The Rabbits who caused all the Trouble" is a short modern fable written by James Thurber. It first appeared in The New Yorker on August 26, 1939; and was first collected in his book Fables for Our Time and Famous Poems Illustrated (Harper and Brothers, 1940). The fable has since been reprinted in The Thurber Carnival (Harper and Brothers, 1945), James Thurber: Writings and Drawings (The Library of America, 1996, ISBN 1-883011-22-1), The Oxford Book of Modern Fairy Tales, and other publications. The story is often used in literature and composition classes.

== Main characters ==
The characters in the fable are all animals. There is a family of rabbits who live near a pack of wolves. There are other nameless animals who do not play an active role in the story.

== Plot summary ==
The wolves believe that their way of life is the only way to live, and therefore dislike the rabbits. After an earthquake occurs, the wolves blame the rabbits because "it is well known that rabbits pound on the ground with their hind legs and cause earthquakes". Next, the wolves blame the rabbits for a lightning strike that kills one of the wolves because "it is well known that lettuce-eaters cause lightning". After the wolves announce plans to "civilize" the rabbits if they do not stop causing natural disasters, the rabbits decide to flee to an island. However, the other nameless animals—living out of harm's way—convince the rabbits to stay because "This is no world for escapists" and guarantee them protection against the wolves—"in all probability".

After a flood—"it is well known that carrot-nibblers with long ears cause floods"—the wolves decide to imprison the rabbits, "for their own good". Weeks later the other animals notice the absence of the rabbits and ask the wolves about them. The wolves answer that it is "a purely internal matter" (because they ate the rabbits). The wolves also claim the rabbits were trying to escape "and, as you know, this is no world for escapists".

Detail from James Thurber's original illustration

== Major themes ==
The short story alludes to events that occurred around the time period of the Second World War. The rabbits represent the minorities who were persecuted like the Jews in Nazi Germany. The wolves represent the majority who display an irrational prejudice and hatred towards the minority, the rabbits. As events unfold, the rest of the animals represent all the other nations of the world who were mute spectators as events unfolded leading to the Holocaust.

== Popular culture ==
The story was read aloud by Television Broadcaster Keith Olbermann in one of the segments of his MSNBC program Countdown with Keith Olbermann on Fridays, which he called "Fridays with Thurber." He did this on the suggestion of his dying father Theodore, to whom he read many of the stories in his hospital bed. On April 9, 2010, Olbermann read aloud the story "The Rabbits Who Caused All the Trouble".
