= Curfew Must Not Ring Tonight =

Narrative poem

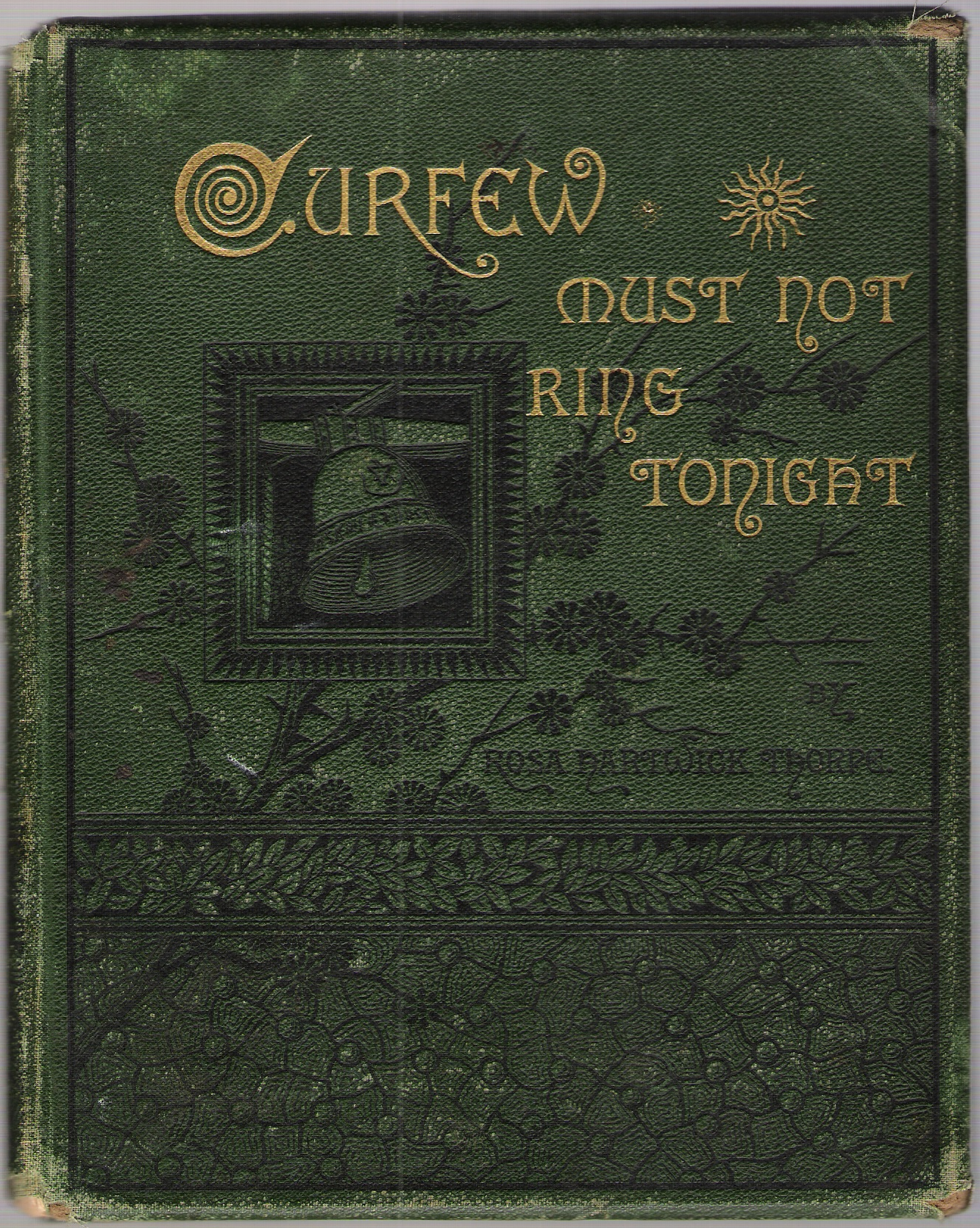
Cover of an 1880s edition

"Curfew Must Not Ring Tonight" is a narrative poem by Rose Hartwick Thorpe, written in 1867 and set in the 17th century. It was written when she was 16 years old and first published in Detroit Commercial Advertiser. The poem consists of ten stanzas of six lines each, written in catalectic trochaic octameter; the ending of the last verse of each stanza is a variant of the title.

== Synopsis ==
The story involves Bessie, a young woman whose lover, Basil Underwood, has been arrested, thrown in prison by the Puritans and sentenced to die that night when the curfew bell rings. Knowing that Oliver Cromwell will be late in arriving, the young woman begs the old sexton to prevent the ringing of the curfew bell. When he refuses, she climbs to the top of the bell tower and heroically risks her life by manually stopping the bell from ringing. Cromwell hears of her deed and is so moved that he issues a pardon for Underwood.

== Inspiration and publication ==
The material upon which Rose Hartwick Thorpe based her poem is Lydia Sigourney's article "Love and Loyalty", which appeared posthumously in Peterson's Magazine in September 1865. It is likely to have been based on the earlier work "Blanche Heriot. A legend of old Chertsey Church", which was published by Albert Richard Smith in The Wassail-Bowl, Vol. II., in 1843. In Smith's account, the young woman, Blanche Heriot, has a lover known as Neville Audley, and the action takes place in 1471 during the Wars of the Roses in England.

Thorpe wrote her poem in 1867, following the American Civil War, while living in Litchfield, Michigan. She traded the manuscript to a Detroit newspaper in exchange for a subscription. The original newspaper printing has never been found, but the poem was widely printed before the first version in book form in 1882.

== In popular culture ==
Thorpe's poem, a favorite of Queen Victoria's, was one of the most popular of the 19th century, but later faded into obscurity. An 8-foot monument in Litchfield, Michigan along State Highway 99 honors the poem and author's connection to that town.

In the 1890s, playwright David Belasco used "Curfew Must Not Ring Tonight" as an inspiration for his play The Heart of Maryland. As he recalled,

"The picture of that swaying young figure hanging heroically to the clapper of an old church bell lived in my memory for a quarter of a century. When the time came that I needed a play to exploit the love and heroism of a woman I wrote a play around that picture."

== References in other genres ==
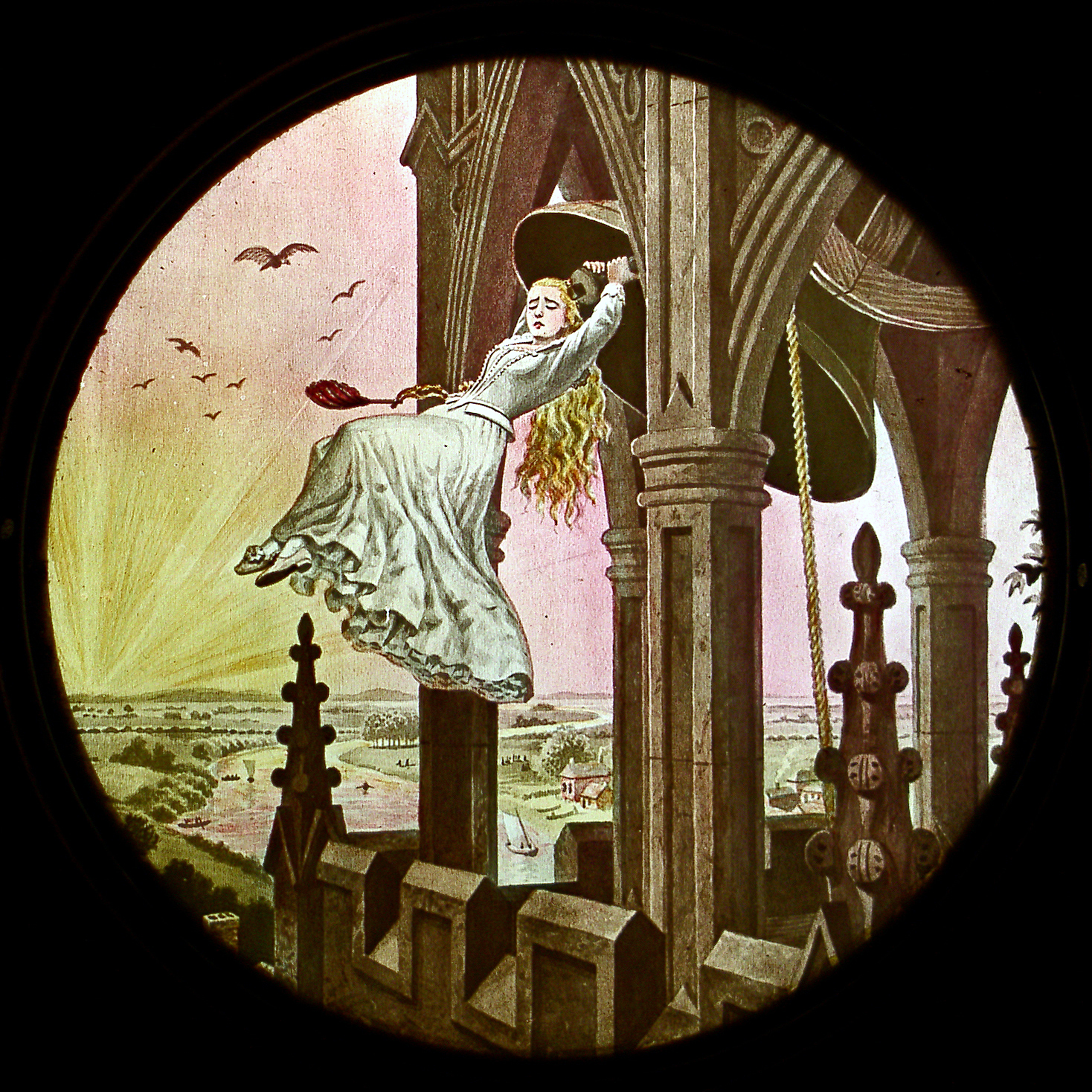
1899 Joseph Boggs Beale magic lantern slide, depicting "Curfew Must Not Ring Tonight"

A late Victorian English poem from the 1880s, "Chertsey Curfew" by Boyd Montgomerie Ranking, treats the same events.

In 1895, Stanley Hawley wrote music to accompany the poem's recitation (a performance tradition known as melodrama). This was published as sheet music by Robert Cooks and Co.

The poem was widely known in the English-speaking world. In her novel Anne of Green Gables (1908), set in Prince Edward Island, author Lucy Maud Montgomery has the character Prissy Andrews recite it.

The character, Mattie Silver, from Ethan Frome (1911), has few life skills but can recite "Curfew shall not ring to-night".

Three silent films were made based on the poem. For two of the films, the title was modified to Curfew Shall Not Ring Tonight. No sound version has been made, but later 20th century films referred to this poem.

Jack Warner quoted the poem ironically in the film Scrooge (1951). Katharine Hepburn quoted it at length (for comedic effect) in the film Desk Set (1957). She provides a melodramatic reading while a revolutionary new computer created by Richard Sumner (Spencer Tracy) prints out the poem in response to a misspelled request for information on Corfu.

An illustrated version of this poem is contained in Fables for Our Time and Famous Poems Illustrated by James Thurber (1940).

The poem is mentioned by author Antonia White in her autobiography As Once in May. As a child she read it repeatedly until she knew it by heart.

A parody poem Towser shall be Tied Tonight was written by Anonymous. Set in Kansas, it tells the story of two lovers whose tryst is threatened by the eponymous guard dog.
