= Barbara Frietchie (1915 film) =

1915 film by Herbert Blaché

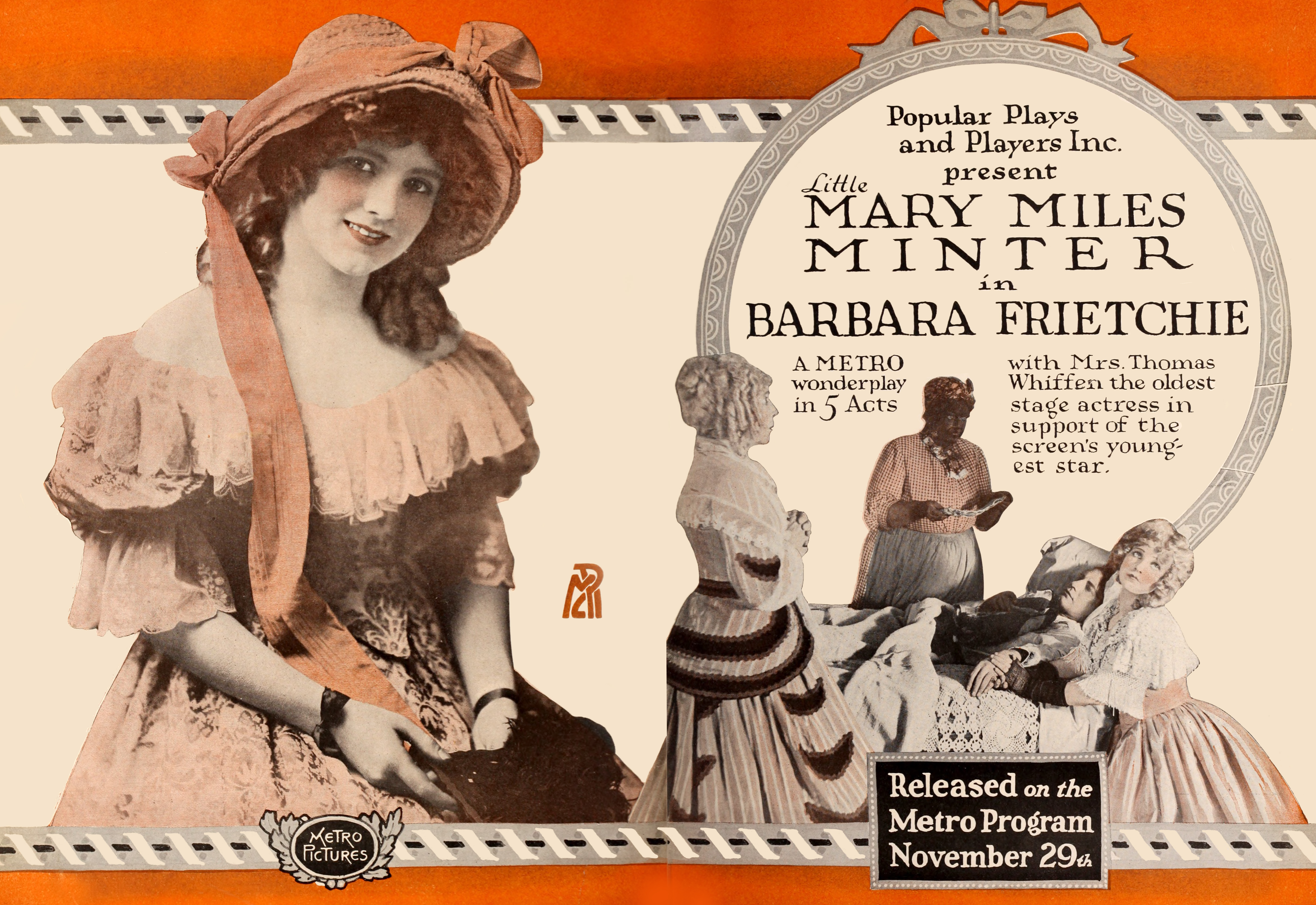
- Advertisement from Motion Picture News (November 27, 1915)
- Directed by: Herbert Blaché
- Written by: Clarence J Harris (scenario), John Greenleaf Whittier (poem), Clyde Fitch (play)
- Starring: Mary Miles Minter
- Production companies: Popular Plays and Players Inc.
- Distributed by: Metro Pictures
- Release date: November 29, 1915 (United States)
- Running time: 5 reels
- Country: United States
- Language: Silent (English intertitles)

Barbara Frietchie is a 1915 silent drama film directed by Herbert Blaché and starring Mary Miles Minter. It is based upon the 1899 play Barbara Frietchie by Clyde Fitch, which was in turn inspired by the John Greenleaf Whittier poem of the same name. As with many of Minter's movies, the film is thought to be a lost film.

== Plot ==
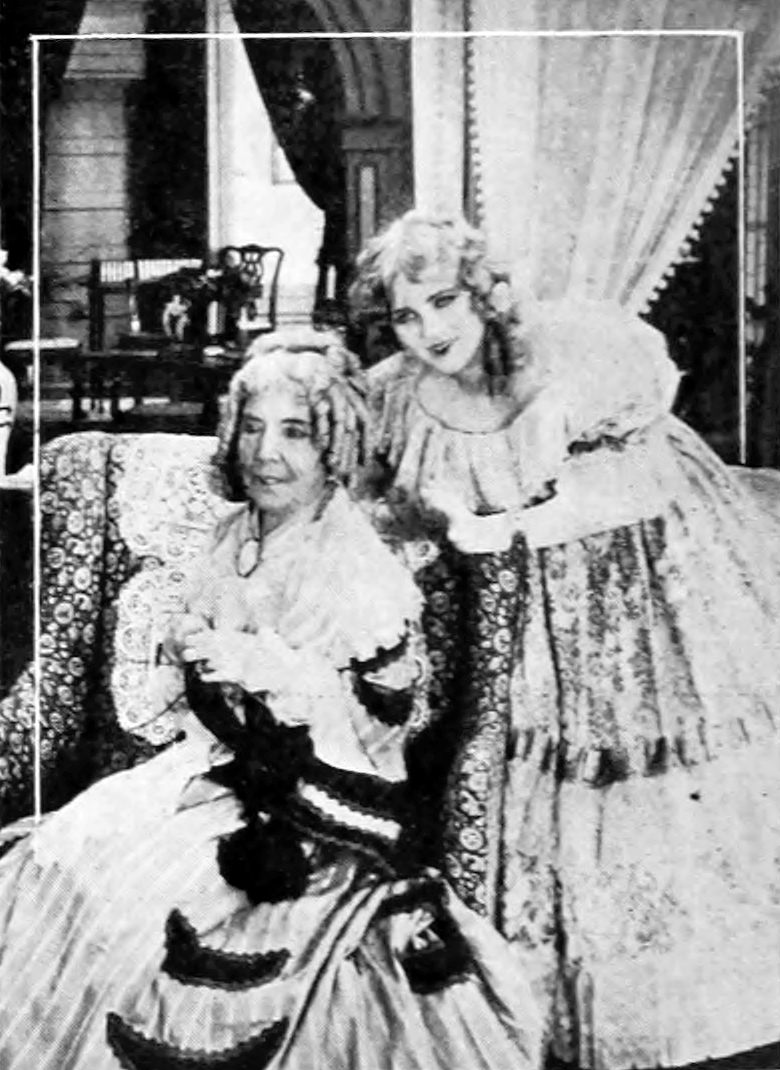
Blanche Whiffen and Mary Miles Minter in Barbara Frietchie

The film is set in Frederick, Maryland, during the American Civil War. As described in film magazines, young Barbara Frietchie, just turned eighteen, lives with her grandmother and namesake in a town occupied by Northern troops. She falls for Captain Trumbull, a Union officer, to the disappointment of her father, but her grandmother supports the match. When the Confederate forces re-take the town, Captain Trumbull is shot and severely wounded by Barbara's brother, a Confederate officer. Although he is carried to the Frietchie home and cared for by Barbara and her grandmother, Captain Trumbull dies from his injuries. Both Barbaras are devastated, and wave the stars and stripes from their balcony in defiance of the passing Confederate soldiers. One of these soldiers, Jack Negly, a suitor whom Barbara had rejected in favour of Captain Trumbull, fires a single shot at the balcony. The bullet hits the younger Barbara, and she is re-united in death with her Union sweetheart.

== Cast ==
- Blanche Whiffen (billed as Mrs. Thomas Whiffen) as Barbara Frietchie
- Mary Miles Minter as Barbara, Mrs Frietchie's granddaughter
- Guy Coombs as Captain Trumbull
- Fraunie Fraunholz as Jack Negly
- Lewis Sealy as Judge Frietchie
- Wallace Scott as Arthur Frietchie
- Frederick Heck as Colonel Negly
- Anna Q. Nilsson as Sue Negly

== Trivia ==
The December 1915 issue of Photoplay notes an incident from filming wherein Minter accidentally shot her co-star William Morse in the arm – fortunately the wound did not prove to be serious.

== See also ==
- List of films and television shows about the American Civil War
