= Rose Hartwick Thorpe =

American poet (1850–1939)

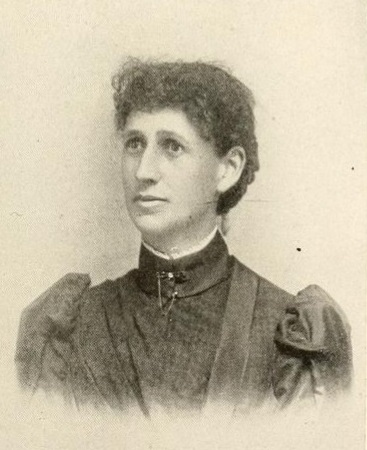
- Thorpe in A Woman of the Century
- Born: Rose Alnora Hartwick; July 18, 1850; Mishawaka, Indiana, U.S.
- Died: July 19, 1939 (aged 89)
- Occupations: Poet, writer
- Spouse: Edmund C. Thorpe
- Writing career
- Language: English
- Notable work: Curfew Must Not Ring Tonight

Rose Hartwick Thorpe (July 18, 1850 – July 19, 1939) was an American poet and writer, remembered largely for the narrative poem, Curfew Must Not Ring Tonight (1867), which gained national popularity and circulated abroad in a number of translations. Other poems followed, among them being "The Station Agent's Story", "Red Cross", and "In a Mining Town". Although a busy and prolific author, she was ill for some years. In 1888, she and her family moved to San Diego, California, living in Rosemere, Pacific Beach. Thorpe gave San Diego's "False Bay" the new moniker "Mission Bay" in a poem published in 1888 in The Golden Era; the name persists today.

== Early years and education ==
Rose Alnora Hartwick was born in Mishawaka, Indiana, July 18, 1850. She was the daughter of William Morris and Mary Louisa (Wight) Hartwick. Her father's family were artists.

In 1861, her parents moved to Hillsdale County, where she grew up, attended school, and began writing at an early age. She completed her education at the high school of Litchfield, Michigan, in 1868.

== Career ==
She began her literary career while still a school-girl in Litchfield by the publication of the ballad, "Curfew Must Not Ring To night" in the Detroit Commercial Advertiser, which immediately obtained enthusiastic recognition throughout the country. The prose sketch was based on a legendary incident of the time of Oliver Cromwell, in April 1867. It was her first publication.

In 1871, she married Edmund Carson Thorpe, a writer of German dialect recitations.

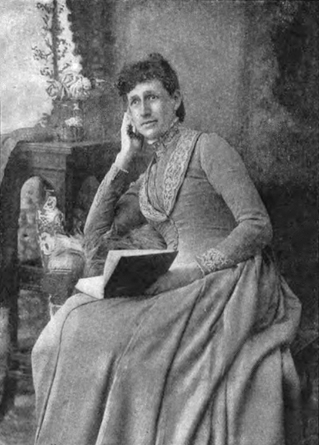
Rose Hartwick Thorpe, 1897

For a number of years, she contributed regularly to leading magazines and weeklies with popular short stories and poems. Her best-known shorter poems are "The Station Agent's Story" and "Remember the Alamo". Others include "In a Mining Town" and "Red Cross". During 1881–82, she edited several publications for Fleming H. Revell, of Chicago. She was particularly successful with her stories for young people. Her published books are: Fred's Dark Days (1881); The Yule Log (1881); The Fenton Family (1884); Nina Bruce; or, A Girl's Influence (1886); Temperance Poems (1886); The Chester Girls (1887); Ringing Ballads (1887); The Year's Best Days (1888); and Sweet Song Stories (1898). The Year's Best Days, for Boys and Girls was a collection of stories in prose and in verse, for young people. "New Year's Day", "St. Valentine's Day", "April Fool's Day", "Easter Day", "Thanksgiving Day", "Birthday", "Christmas", were the subjects covered by Thorpe. The series of entertaining stories for children also included poetry and illustrations. In 1882, an illustrated edition of "Curfew Must Not Ring To-night" was issued. Nearly all of her books were profusely illustrated, including by her daughter, Mrs. Lulo Thorpe Barnes.

In 1904, Thorpe wrote about the White Lady Cave in San Diego-La Jolla Underwater Park in California. Visitors inside the cave could see the outline of a lady in the rock formations and local legend claimed a bride was trapped in the cave before her death. In The White Lady of La Jolla, Thorpe described: "She is robed in shimmering garments of light, wrapped in a misty veil, and on her head is a wreath like a coronet of orange blossoms".

== Affiliations ==
She was a member of the Pacific Coast Women's Press Association; of the Ladies' Literary Club. Grand Rapids, Michigan, and of the Woman's Club of San Diego, California, which she founded.

== Personal life ==
A biographical sketch of Thorpe published in The Magazine of Poetry and Literary Review in 1889 noted that Thorpe had been hindered for a few years by ill health, but was recovering after her relocation to California. She died in San Diego, July 19, 1939, aged 89.

== Awards and legacy ==
In 1883, Hillsdale College (Michigan) conferred on Mrs. Thorpe the honorary degree of A.M., because, as Pres. Durgin wrote; "You have written a poem that will never permit the name of its author to die while the English language is spoken".

Litchfield adopted the title of the poem as a symbol, having fire trucks and the city website show the symbol of a bell reading "Curfew Shall Not Ring Tonight". A bell in the center of Litchfield commemorates the poem and Thorpe's time spent in the town.

Thorpe gave San Diego's "False Bay" the new moniker "Mission Bay" in a poem published in 1888 in The Golden Era The name persists today.

== Selected works ==
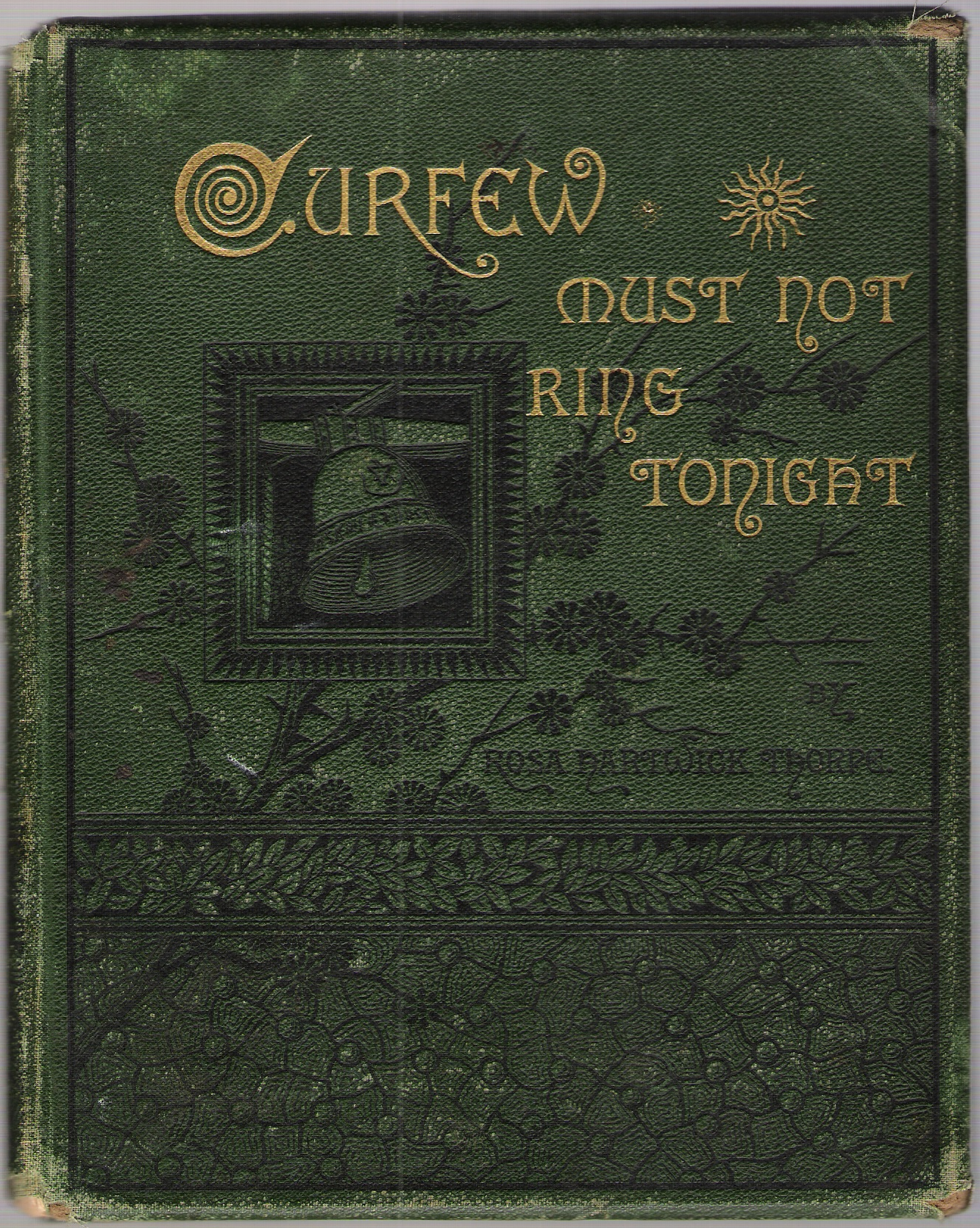
Curfew Must Not Ring Tonight

- 1887, Ringing ballads,: including Curfew must not ring tonight
- 188?, The yule log: a cluster of Christmas selections from holiday times
- 1881, Fred's dark days
- 1886, Nina Bruce; or, A girl's influence
- 1887, Temperance poems
- 1887, The Chester girls
- 1888, The year's best days for boys and girls
- 1896, As others see us, or, The rules and customs of refined homes and polite society ... : also complete self instruction in physical culture for both ladies and gentlemen
- 1904, White lady of la jolla
