= Spencer Leigh (radio presenter) =

BBC Radio presenter (born 1945)

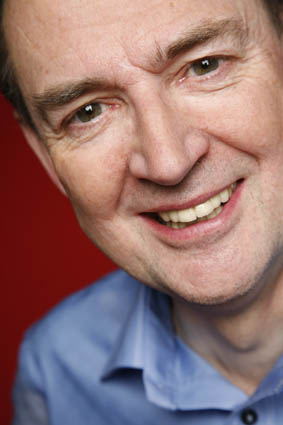
- Headshot of Spencer Leigh
- Born: 1 February 1945 (age 81); Waterloo, Lancashire, England
- Occupations: Radio presenter, author, obituarist
- Years active: 1972–present
- Spouse: Anne Leigh
- Website: Spencerleigh.co.uk

Spencer Leigh (born 1 February 1945) is a BBC Radio presenter and author, with particular expertise in the development of pop and rock music and culture in Britain.

== Career ==
Leigh was born in Waterloo, Merseyside. He attended Rydal School, Colwyn Bay, North Wales and Merchant Taylors' Boys' School, Crosby. He qualified as an actuary, and worked for Royal Insurance. He became Royal Life's chief underwriter.

== Broadcaster ==
Leigh started broadcasting on BBC Radio Merseyside in the early 1970s. In 1975 he did public interviews with Allan Williams, one being in front of Southport Arts Centre. It was the first time Williams had spoken publicly about his time with the Beatles and he became a favourite at Beatle conventions. Leigh always enjoyed having Williams on stage with the Cavern DJ Bon Wooler. "They would contradict each other all the time and although it wasn't their intention, they provided the funniest moments ever at the Beatle conventions in Liverpool. "My job was simply to stop it getting out of hand," says Spencer.

Leigh wrote that Mike Hart was his preferred performer on the Liverpool poetry circuit. In July 1972 he took part in a poetry event at Freshfield, with the poets Harold and Sylvia Hikins, and the folk duo Rusty of Allen Mayes and Declan MacManus. His first radio series, No Holds Bard, of that year, was based around the Mersey poets. "A disastrous title," says Spencer, "It would work fine in a book but not in speech. Still, you learn as you go along."

His music programme On the Beat ran continuously from 1985 to 2020 on BBC Radio Merseyside. Over the years, Leigh interviewed thousands of musicians on the show. He has interviewed many people connected to the Liverpool 1960s scene. There have been several one-off series on BBC Radio Merseyside, the best known being Let's Go Down the Cavern (1981), which was also broadcast on local BBC stations throughout the UK.

The entire collection of 2,027 programmes has been donated to Liverpool Central Library, and there is an on-going project to archive them. Some one-off series have been given to the British Library.

== Writer ==
Leigh's first book Paul Simon – Now and Then, published in 1973, was the first biography of the American singer-songwriter Paul Simon. He has written the sleeve notes or CD booklets for over 300 albums. He writes obituaries of musicians for The Guardian, The Independent, and the Oxford Dictionary of National Biography; he has also written extensively for Record Collector, Country Music People and Now Dig This. He has a weekly 'My City' column every Saturday in the Liverpool Echo.

His history of British pop before the Beatles, Halfway To Paradise (1996), has been expanded and issued in two volumes as British Pop Before The Beatles (Kindle). For the sixtieth anniversary of the Beatles' first Parlophone single, "Love Me Do", he and Mike Jones wrote The Road to Love Me Do, which was published in September 2022.

Leigh has also published on health insurance ethics.

== Publications ==
- Paul Simon - Now and Then (1973)
- Presley Nation (1976)
- Stars in my Eyes - Personal Interviews With Top Music Stars (1980)
- Let's Go Down the Cavern (1984)
- Speaking Words of Wisdom (1991)
- Halfway to Paradise, Britpop 1955–1962 (1996)
- Drummed Out! – The Sacking of Pete Best (1998). Later version Best of the Beatles: The Sacking Of Pete Best (2015)
- Baby, That Is Rock and Roll, American Pop, 1954–1963 (2000)
- Brother, Can You Spare a Rhyme? - 100 Years Of Hit Songwriting (2001)
- Puttin' on the Style – The Lonnie Donegan Story (2002)
- Sweeping the Blues Away – A Celebration of the Merseysippi Jazz Band (2002)
- The Best of Fellas – The Story of Bob Wooler, Liverpool's First DJ (2002)
- Twist and Shout! – Merseybeat, the Cavern, the Star-Club and the Beatles (2004)
- Sound! – The Liverpool Pop Quiz Book (2004)
- Wondrous Face – The Billy Fury Story (2005)
- Things Do Go Wrong (2008; Kindle 2012)
- The Cavern – The Most Famous Club in the World (2008). Updated version The Cavern Club: The Rise of the Beatles and Merseybeat (2015).
- Everyday - Getting Closer to Buddy Holly (2009). Later version Buddy Holly: Learning The Game (January 2019) Revised and updated version of 'Everyday - Getting Closer to Buddy Holly'
- Tomorrow Never Knows: The Beatles on Record (2010). Updated version Love Me Do to Love Me Don't: The Beatles on Record (June 2016).
- It's Love That Really Counts - The Billy Kinsley Story (2010)
- The Beatles in Hamburg (2011)
- The Beatles in Liverpool (2012) Republished in paperback, 2014
- The Beatles in America (2013). Updated version The Beatles in America (Schiffer Publishing, 2024)
- British Pop Before The Beatles: Volume 1 The Story (2015) ebook
- British Pop Before The Beatles: Volume 2 The Profiles (2015) ebook
- American Pop Before The Beatles (2015) ebook
- Frank Sinatra: An Extraordinary Life (2015) Updated version 2022.
- Simon and Garfunkel: Together Alone (2016)
- Elvis Presley: Caught in a Trap (2017)
- Could This Be Magic? The Story of Doo-Wop (April 2020) (e-book)
- Bob Dylan: Outlaw Blues (2020)
- Little Richard: Send Me Some Lovin (2023)
- 80 @ 80 (February 2025)

=== Collaborative works ===
Spencer Leigh has also written or collaborated on the following books with other authors:

- Memories of Buddy Holly with Jim Dawson (1996)
- The Walrus Was Ringo – 101 Beatles Myths Debunked (2002) by Alan Clayson and Spencer Leigh
- 1000 UK Number One Hits (2005) with Jon Kutner
- Aspects of Elvis - Tryin' To Get To You (1994) edited by Alan Clayson and Spencer Leigh
- Behind the Song - The Stories of 100 Great Pop and Rock Classics (1998) by Michael Heatley and Spencer Leigh
- The Beatles Book (Hunter Davies (2016) with Keith Badman, David Bedford and Spencer Leigh)
- Congratulations: Songwriter to the Stars Bill Martin's biography, ghosted by Spencer Leigh (2017)
- 30-Second Rock Music ([Mike Evans]) (2018) Edited by Mike Evans with Gillian Gaar, Patrick Humphries Paul Kingsbury, Spencer Leigh and Hugh Weldon
- The Road to Love Me Do: The Beatles and their Liverpool Contemporaries (September 2022) with Mike Jones

== Family ==
In 2015 Leigh was living with his wife Anne in Ainsdale, south of Southport.
