= In the Venusberg =

Painting by John Collier

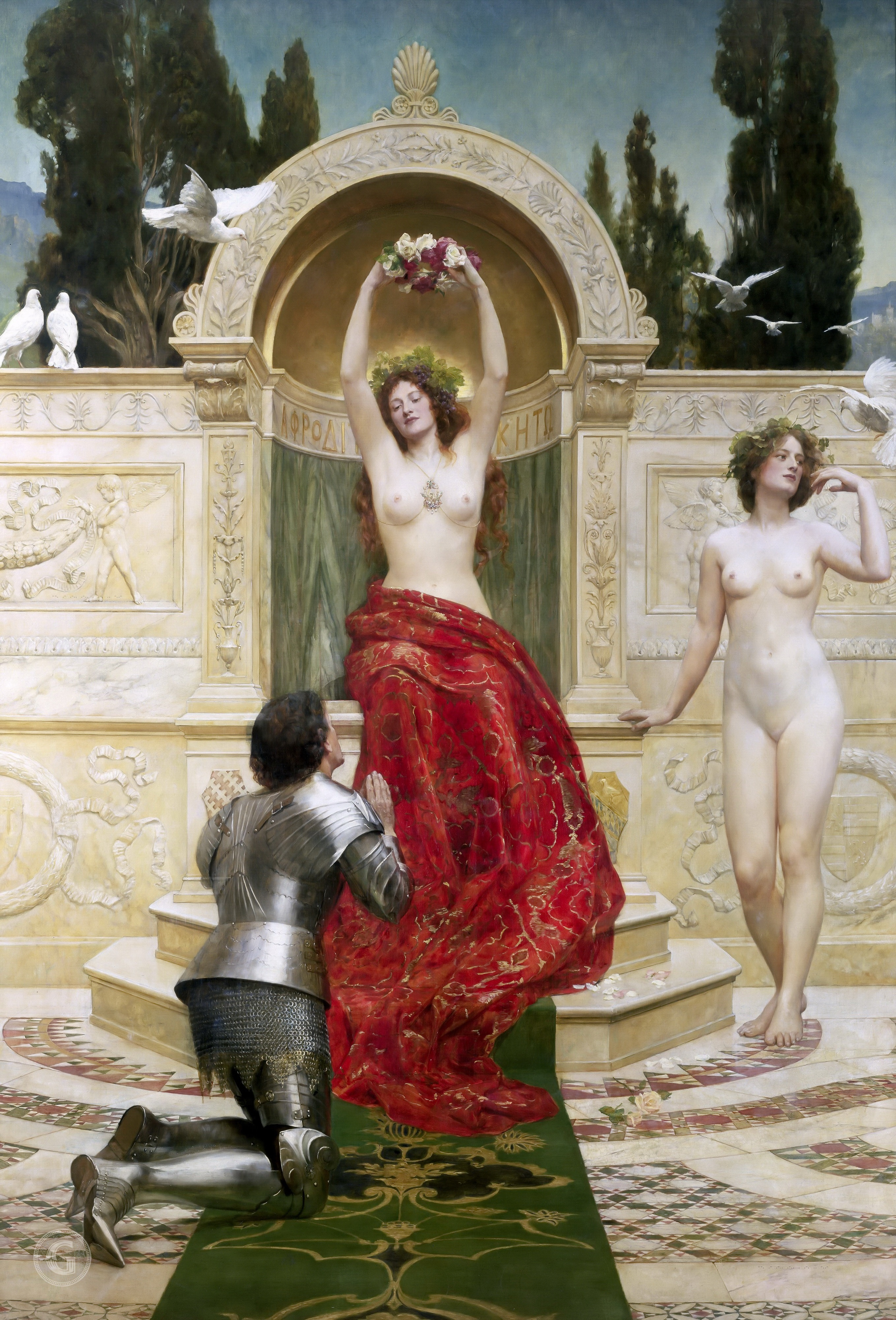
- Artist: John Collier
- Year: 1901
- Medium: Oil on canvas, history painting
- Dimensions: 243 cm × 168 cm (96 in × 66 in)
- Location: Atkinson Art Gallery, Southport

In the Venusberg is a 1901 oil painting by the British artist John Collier. Inspired by the legend of Tannhäuser, that had become celebrated through the Richard Wagner opera Tannhäuser, it shows a scene of the mythological, Venusberg and juxtaposes the chivalrous knight in armour with Venus and a nymph. As was common in academic art of the time, it blends elements of history painting and nude art.

Today the painting is in the collection of the Atkinson Art Gallery in Southport, having been purchased in 1902.

== Bibliography ==
- Anderson, Gail-Nina & Wright, Joanne. Heaven on Earth: The Religion of Beauty in Late Victorian Art. University of Nottingham, 1994.
- Cavaliero, Roderick. Genius, Power and Magic: A Cultural History of Germany from Goethe to Wagner. Bloomsbury Publishing, 2013.
