= Atkinson Art Gallery and Library =

The Atkinson (original building)
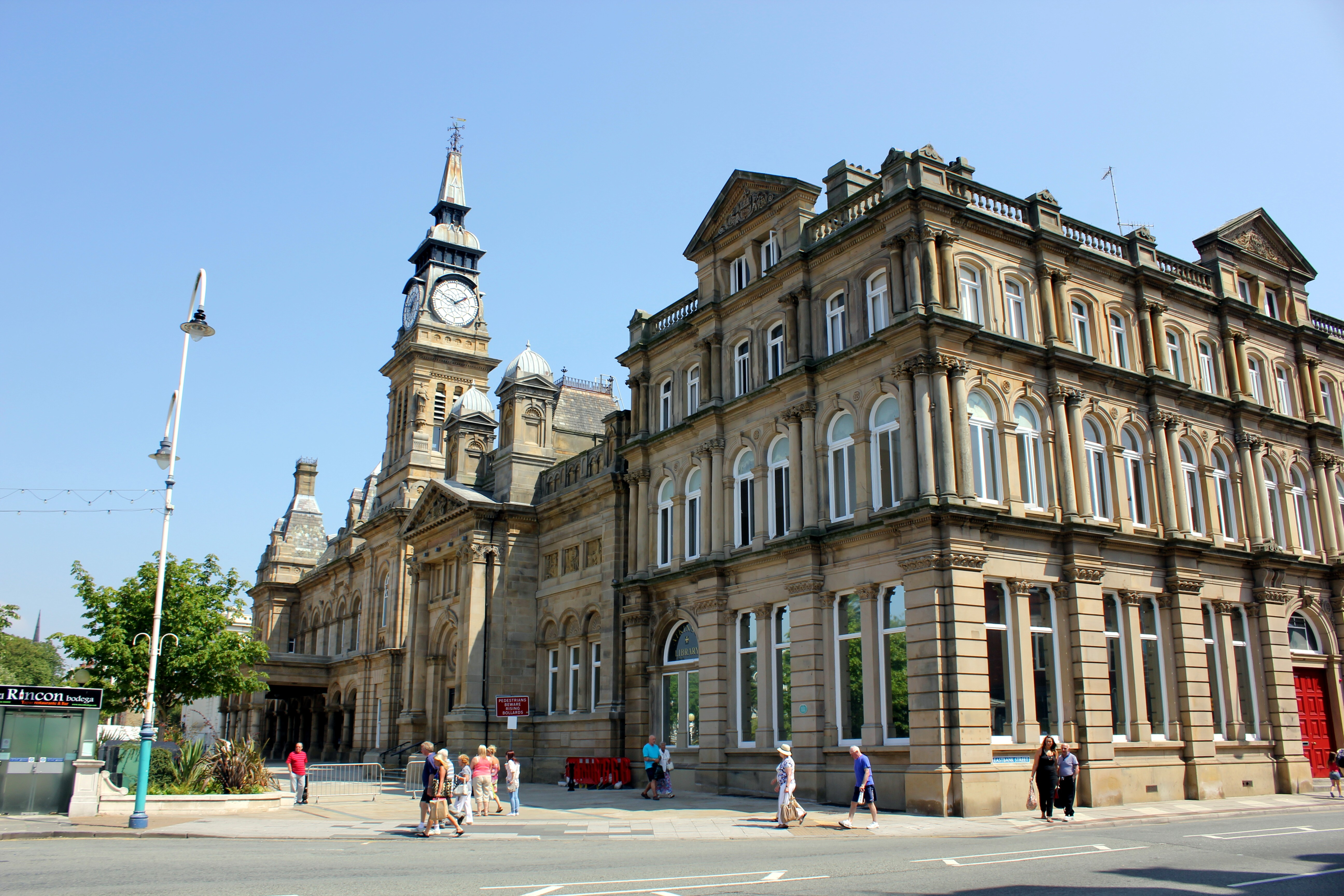
- The combined building, with the former bank in the foreground

- Location within Southport town centre
- 53.6470°N 3.0065°W
- Location: Lord Street, Southport, Sefton, Merseyside, England
- OS grid reference: SD 336 172

History
- Built: 1876–1878
- Built for: Southport Corporation

Site notes
- Architect(s): Waddington and Son
- Architectural style: Neoclassical
- Governing body: Sefton Metropolitan Borough Council
- Website: https://www.theatkinson.co.uk

Listed Building – Grade II
- Designated: 15 November 1972
- Reference no.: 1379669

Atkinson Art Gallery and Library (former bank)
- Interactive map of Atkinson Art Gallery and Library (former bank)

History
- Built: 1879
- Built for: Manchester and Liverpool District Bank

Site notes
- Architectural style: Renaissance

Listed Building – Grade II
- Designated: 29 July 1999
- Reference no.: 1379675

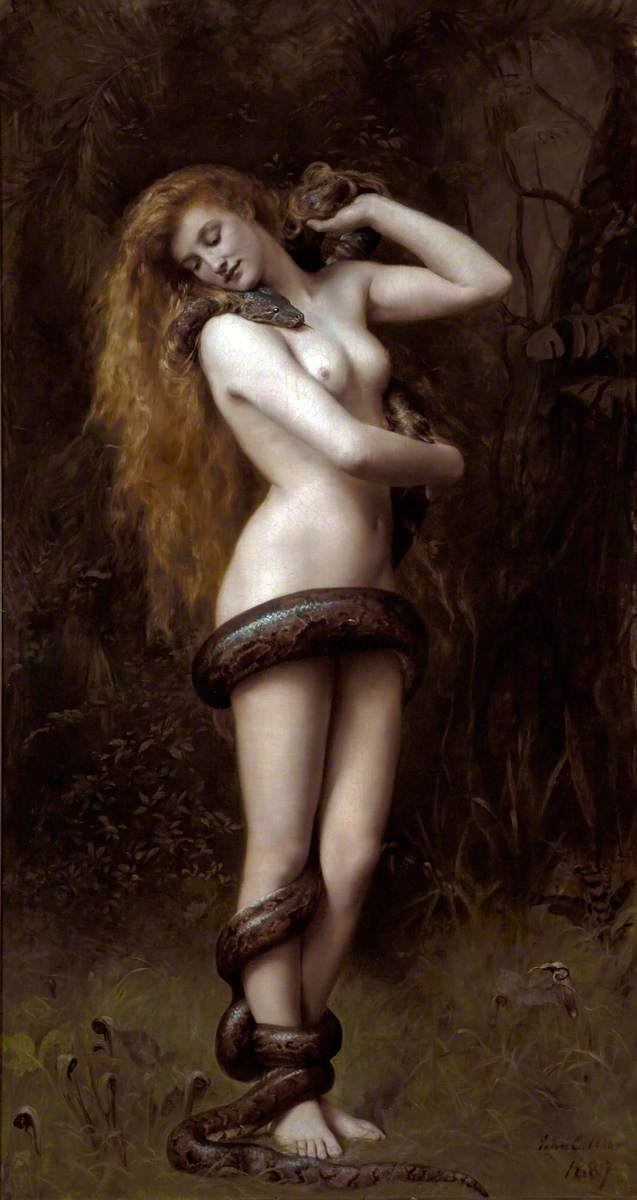
Lilith, 1887, by Pre-Raphaelite painter John Collier

The Atkinson is a building on the east side of Lord Street extending round the corner into Eastbank Street, Southport, Sefton, Merseyside, England. The building is a combination of two former buildings, the original Atkinson Art Gallery and Library that opened in 1879, and the adjacent Manchester and Liverpool District Bank that was built in 1879. These were combined in 1923–24 and the interiors have been integrated. The original building is in Neoclassical style, and the former bank is in Renaissance style.

The art gallery and library has been integrated with the Southport Arts Centre and is now known as The Atkinson.

The two former buildings are each recorded in the National Heritage List for England as designated Grade II listed buildings.

== History ==
The Atkinson was built following a donation of £6,000 in 1875 by William Atkinson, a cotton manufacturer from Knaresborough, North Yorkshire, and a frequent visitor to Southport. The building was designed by Waddington and Son of Burnley, Lancashire and opened in 1878. The total cost, donated by Atkinson, was £15,000. In 1923–24 the building was extended by incorporating an adjacent bank on the corner of Eastbank Street, that had been built for the Manchester and Liverpool District Bank in 1879. The interior of the combined building was remodeled in the late 20th century, and the interiors were internally integrated. As of 2014 the organisation of the library and art gallery is integrated with the Southport Arts Centre and it is known as The Atkinson.

== Architecture ==
=== Original building ===
The original building is constructed in sandstone with a slate roof in Neoclassical style. It is in three storeys and has a symmetrical three-bay front. The central bay projects forward and contains a square-headed doorway above which is a roundel and a band of three panels. It is flanked by pairs of engaged Corinthian columns, above which is an entablature with a frieze inscribed with "ATKINSON FREE LIBRARY" and a pediment. The roundel includes a carving of a female bust representing Thought. The tympanum of the pediment contains carved personifications of Art, Science, Literature, Inspiration, and Commerce. The outer bays each incorporate a foundation stone in the plinth, a three-light window in an arcade in the lower floor, and carved panels in the upper floor. The panels are carved with allegories including Painting, Drama and Science. All the carvings were executed by G. W. Seale.

=== Former bank ===
The former bank is built in sandstone ashlar with a slate roof in Renaissance style. It has three storeys and an attic, each floor diminishing upwards in size. There are three bays on the Lord Street front and seven bays on Eastbank Street. In the ground floor, separating and flanking the bays, are channelled pilasters with crocketed caps, a frieze and a cornice. Above these, on both floors are pairs of colonnettes with foliated caps, a frieze and a cornice. Along the top of the building is a balustraded parapet, and a pedimented attic window in the central bay of each side. In the left bay of the Lord Street face and in the central bay of the Eastbank Street face is a round-headed doorway with a moulded head, a keystone and carved spandrels. The other bays on Lord Street and the first three bays on Eastbank Street contain tall pilastered two-light windows; the last three bays on Eastbank Street have inserted shop fronts. In the middle floor each bay contains two round-headed two-light windows with moulded heads and keystones and are flanked by pilasters. The top floor has two segmental-headed two-light windows with moulded architraves in each bay. Internally the former banking hall has retained its plastered coffered ceiling and a Gothic fireplace.

== Present day ==
The ground floor of the former bank is used as a public library. In the floors above are a museum and an exhibition space. These house collections of fine art, decorative art, historical items, and exhibitions of items relating to Egyptology. The arts centre forms part of the complex known as The Atkinson.

== Appraisal ==
Both of the buildings are recorded in the National Heritage List for England as designated Grade II listed buildings. The original Atkinson Art Gallery and Library building was designated on 15 November 1972, and the former bank was designated on 29 July 1999. Grade II is the lowest of the three grades of listing and is applied to buildings that are "nationally important and of special interest". The Atkinson Art Gallery and Library forms a group with other Grade II listed buildings nearby, Southport Town Hall and the Southport Arts Centre.

== Gallery ==
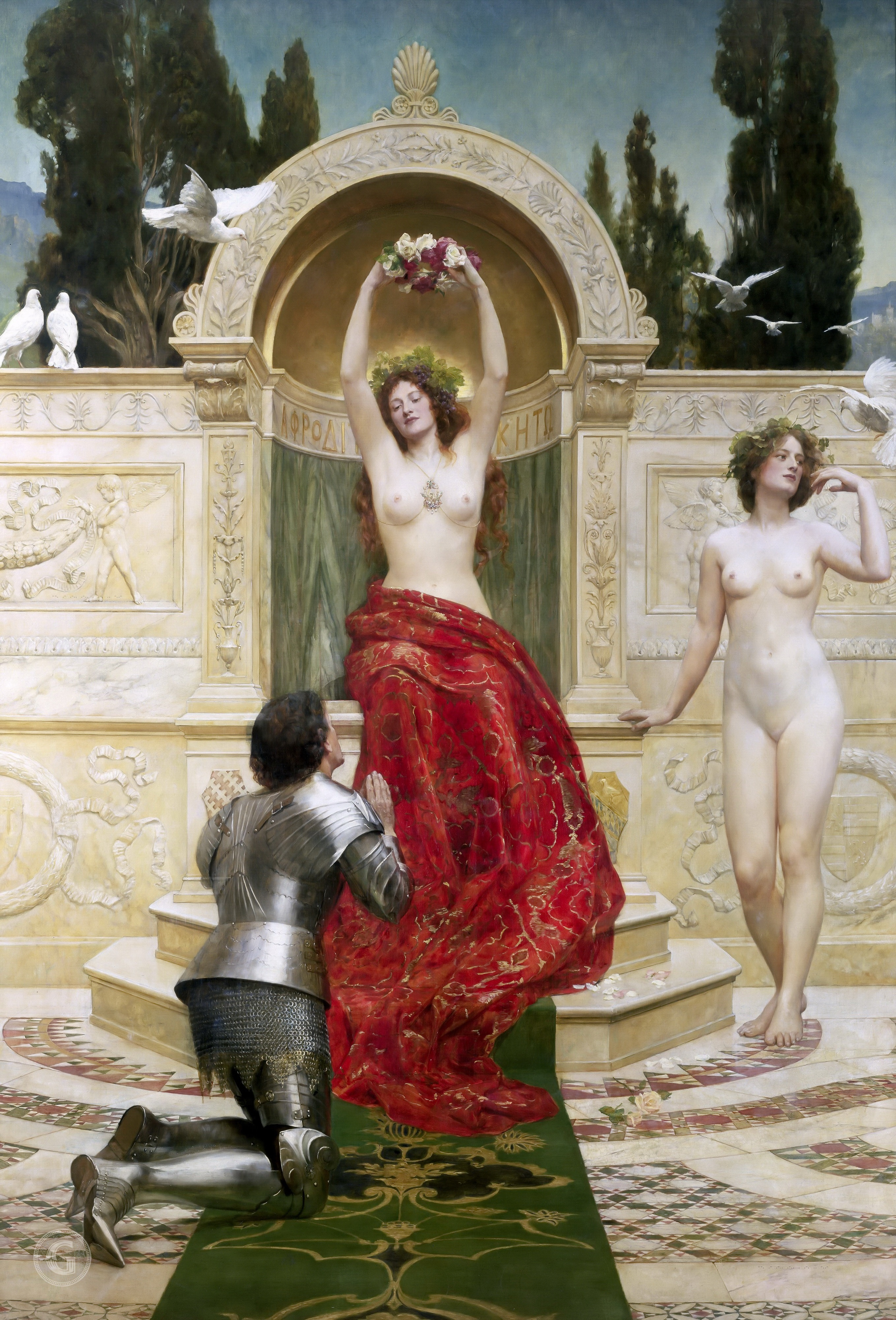
In the Venusberg Tannhauser (c. 1901) John Collier

== See also ==
- Listed buildings in Southport
