= Garrick Theatre, Southport =

Historic building in Southport, England

Garrick Theatre
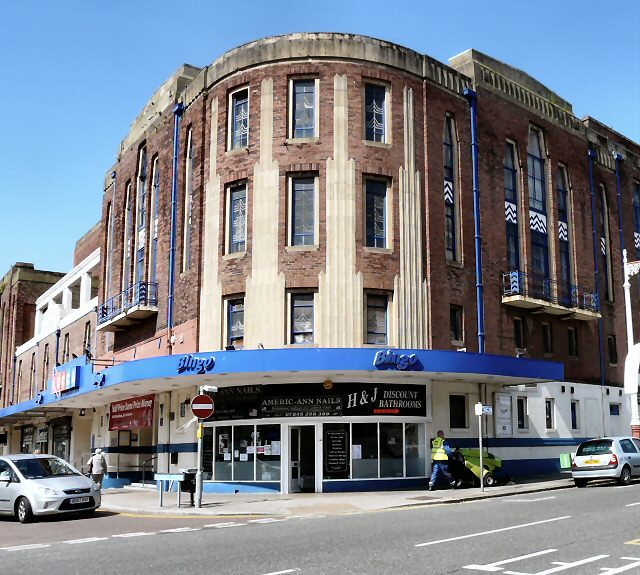
- The theatre in 2009
- Interactive map of Garrick Theatre

General information
- Architectural style: Art Deco
- Location: Southport, Merseyside, Lord Street and Kingsway; Southport PR8 1RN, England
- Coordinates: 53°38′43.408″N 3°0′42.379″W grid reference SD 33213 17018
- Opened: 1932

Design and construction
- Architect: George Tonge

The Garrick Theatre is a former theatre, cinema and bingo hall in Southport, Merseyside, England. it is noted for its Art Deco style, and it is a Grade II listed building.

== History ==
The theatre was built on the site of the Opera House, which had burned down in 1929. It was designed by George Tonge (1876–1956), an architect practicing in Southport, whose work included designing many cinemas. The auditorium seated 1,600, and there was a large stage, to accommodate musicals, operas and ballet. It opened on 19 December 1932, with the play Firebird, featuring Gladys Cooper.

The theatre was sold in 1957 to Essoldo Cinemas, opening on 21 January of that year with the film Love Me Tender. After a brief period as the Essoldo, the name reverted to the Garrick Theatre. From May 1962 no live shows were staged.

It became a bingo hall in 1963; from 1984 it was a Top Rank bingo club, later becoming Mecca Bingo. It closed in March 2020, because of the COVID-19 pandemic, and it was announced in April 2021 that it would not re-open. Mecca Bingo's lease of the building expired in September 2021.

It was given listed status, Grade II, by Historic England on 29 July 1999.

The building was put on the Theatres Trust's Theatres at Risk Register in 2022. In June 2023 the new owner submitted plans to convert the theatre to contain a hotel, residential rooms, and features including a gym, bar and an events space. The application commented: "In general terms, the reordering of areas of the building will have a negligible impact on the significance of the building itself, and allow for a sustainable new use of a key structure." Theatres Trust commented that "we noted concern regarding the viability and deliverability of the plans.... The current scheme proposes loss and harm to the historic fabric without providing adequate detail or information to justify it."

Approval by Sefton Council of the change of use plans was reported in April 2024. Tom Clarke, Theatres Trust's National Planning Adviser, wrote: "It is hugely disappointing that planning permission has been granted without taking into consideration our concerns, and those of Historic England, who also objected to the scheme...." It was reported in October 2025 that work to convert the theatre would begin in May 2026, and would be completed by the end of the year.

== Description ==
The theatre, on the corner of Lord Street and Kingsway, is built of brick with dressings of Portland stone and concrete. There are shops at ground level, above which there are tall windows, decorated with bands of an Art Deco design; above the curved corner there are fluted stone pilasters. On Lord Street to the left of the entrance there is a colonnade above the first floor with an open promenade.

== See also ==
- Listed buildings in Southport
