= Holy Trinity Church, Southport =

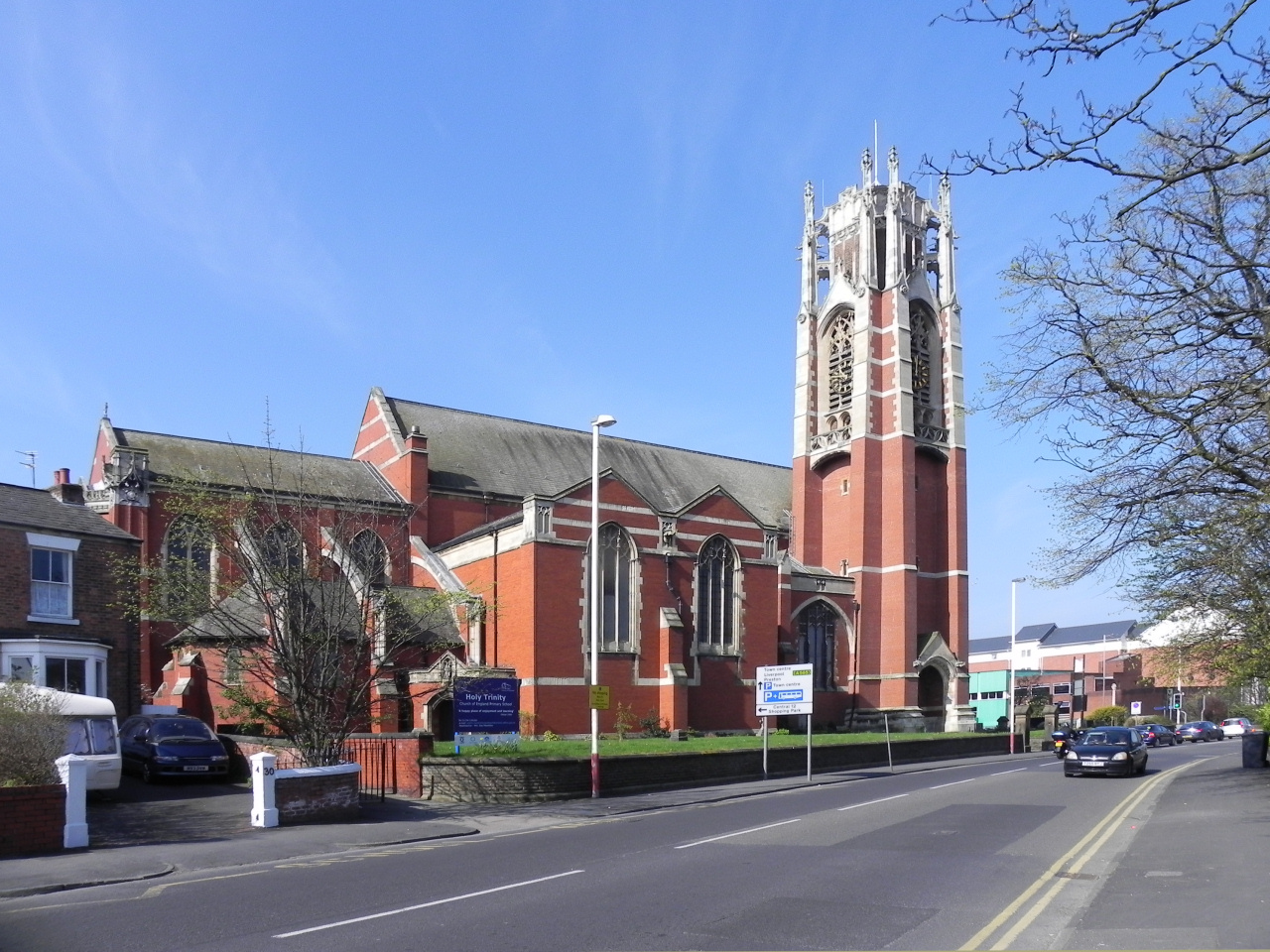
- Holy Trinity Church, Southport, from the northeast

- Location in Merseyside
- 53.6502°N 2.9967°W
- OS grid reference: SD 342 175
- Location: Hoghton Street, Southport, Sefton, Merseyside
- Country: England
- Denomination: Anglican
- Website: www.holytrinitysouthport.org.uk

History
- Status: Parish church
- Consecrated: 12 March 1912

Architecture
- Functional status: Active
- Heritage designation: Grade II*
- Designated: 15 November 1972
- Architect: Huon Matear
- Architectural type: Church
- Style: Gothic Revival (Decorated)
- Groundbreaking: 1904
- Completed: 1913

Specifications
- Length: 157 feet (47.9 m)
- Width: 70 feet (21.3 m)
- Materials: Red brick, Bath stone, Portland stone, Slate roofs

Administration
- Province: York
- Diocese: Liverpool
- Archdeaconry: Warrington
- Deanery: North Meols
- Parish: Holy Trinity, Southport

Clergy
- Vicar: Vacant

Holy Trinity Church in Southport, Merseyside, England, is an Anglican parish church in the diocese of Liverpool and a Grade II* listed building. It was built in the early 20th century, and designed by Huon Matear in free Decorated style. It is constructed mainly in red brick, and has a tower, the upper parts of which are in elaborately decorated stone. Many of the internal furnishings are by the Bromsgrove Guild.

== History ==
Southport did not develop as a town until the later part of the 18th century, before which the area contained only scattered dwellings and small settlements, the main one of which was Churchtown. The area containing the present Holy Trinity Church was in the parish of St Cuthbert, Churchtown, until 1821 when Christ Church was built. At this time the local congregation met in a simple thatched building known as Halls Chapel. As the population in the area grew it became evident that a more substantial building was needed, and the first Holy Trinity Church was built in 1836. This was consecrated on 1 November 1837 by the Rt Rev John Sumner, bishop of Chester. The church was a small structure with a tower, measuring 58 feet 6 inches (17.8 m) by 45 feet 6 inches (13.9 m). In 1840 an organ and gallery were installed in it, the church was extended to the east by 12 feet (3.7 m) and a clock was added to the tower in 1847. There were further extensions in 1860–62.

Later in the century this church was becoming too small for the size of the congregation, and in 1893 a meeting was held to consider plans for a new church on the same site. The Liverpool architect Huon Matear was appointed to design it. On 1 November 1903 a contract was signed with Woods of Bolton to build the nave, and the foundation stone was laid on 12 January 1904 by Mrs Elder, a member of the family running the Elder shipping company. The completed nave was dedicated on 15 December 1904 by the Rt Rev Francis Chavasse, bishop of Liverpool. Work on the rest of the church continued, the transept and two porches being dedicated on 28 January 1911, and when the body of the church was completed it was consecrated on 12 March 1912. At his time the tower was not finished; this was completed by 15 February 1913. The cost of building the church was met by donations from local people in what the authors of the Buildings of England series call an "amazing tour-de-force of Edwardian patronage". The Elder family paid for the nave, the tower and the west front, Joseph Mullineaux Dewhurst, a cotton manufacturer, paid for the chancel, and the cost of the Lady chapel was met by W. B. Taylor and J. A. Grundy.

== Architecture ==
=== Exterior ===
Holy Trinity is faced with red Withnell bricks, it has dressings in Bath stone, while the parapets, the gables, and the top of the tower are in Portland stone, and the roof is in Westmorland green slate. The corner pinnacles have been replaced in fibreglass. The architectural style of the church was described by the architect as being "a free treatment of the late Decorated Period". It consists of a nave, north and south aisles, a north transept, a chancel with a north chapel and a south vestry, and a northwest tower. The overall length of church is 157 feet (47.9 m), its width is 70 feet (21.3 m), and the tower is 142 feet (43.3 m) high. The tower has four stages, the lower two stages are in brick with stone bands, and the upper stages are in stone. It has angle buttresses that rise to become pinnacles. In the bottom stage is a crocketed north doorway under a carved gable, and a west doorway with a gable decorated with wheat ears. The upper two stages are ornately decorated. Each side is arched and contains a louvred three-light bell opening incorporating a clock face. At the bottom of the stage is an openwork balcony, and at the top is a crocketed gablet. The top stage is octagonal and contains blind tracery, a stepped parapet, and short flying buttresses linking to the pinnacles. The west front is flanked by octagonal turrets joined by an arch, below which are two two-light windows and a balustraded balcony. On the south side of the church is a porch. The aisle extends for four bays, each of which contains a four-light window with Perpendicular tracery. On the north side are two similar bays, and a transept with two gables, each containing a three-light window. The chancel has three bays, with flying buttresses over the chapel.

=== Interior ===
Internally the columns and the chancel are in Runcorn stone, and the roof is in pitch pine. The walls are in exposed brick. The aisle arcades are tall and carried on octagonal columns. The north transept is in two bays, with a round column. Most of the furnishings are by the Bromsgrove Guild, and some were designed by Matear. The reredos of 1921 has an elaborately carved frame and contains paintings by Sidney Meteyard with Walter Gilbert. The rood screen incorporates the pulpit and a tester, and is carved with a vine frieze, birds and snails. The furnishings in the choir are also carved and include dragons, ravens, and trumpeting angels. The font is in white marble on a black marble base, and carries the emblems of the Four Evangelists. In the two-bay north arcade is a traceried wooden and glazed screen. In some of the windows in the south aisle is stained glass from the older church. Also in the south aisle is a First World War memorial window by Barrowclough and Sanders, and a window of 1898 by Percy Bacon Brothers. The north aisle has a window of 1929 by H. G. Hiller depicting the Adoration of the Magi. In the transept is a window by the Powells of Christ in Glory. The chapel contains a scheme of windows by Archibald John Davies of the Bromsgrove Guild of Applied Arts including a Crucifixion. In the chancel is another Christ in Glory, this one by Shrigley and Hunt, and an Annunciation of 1914 by Wilhelmina Geddes.

== Organ and choir ==
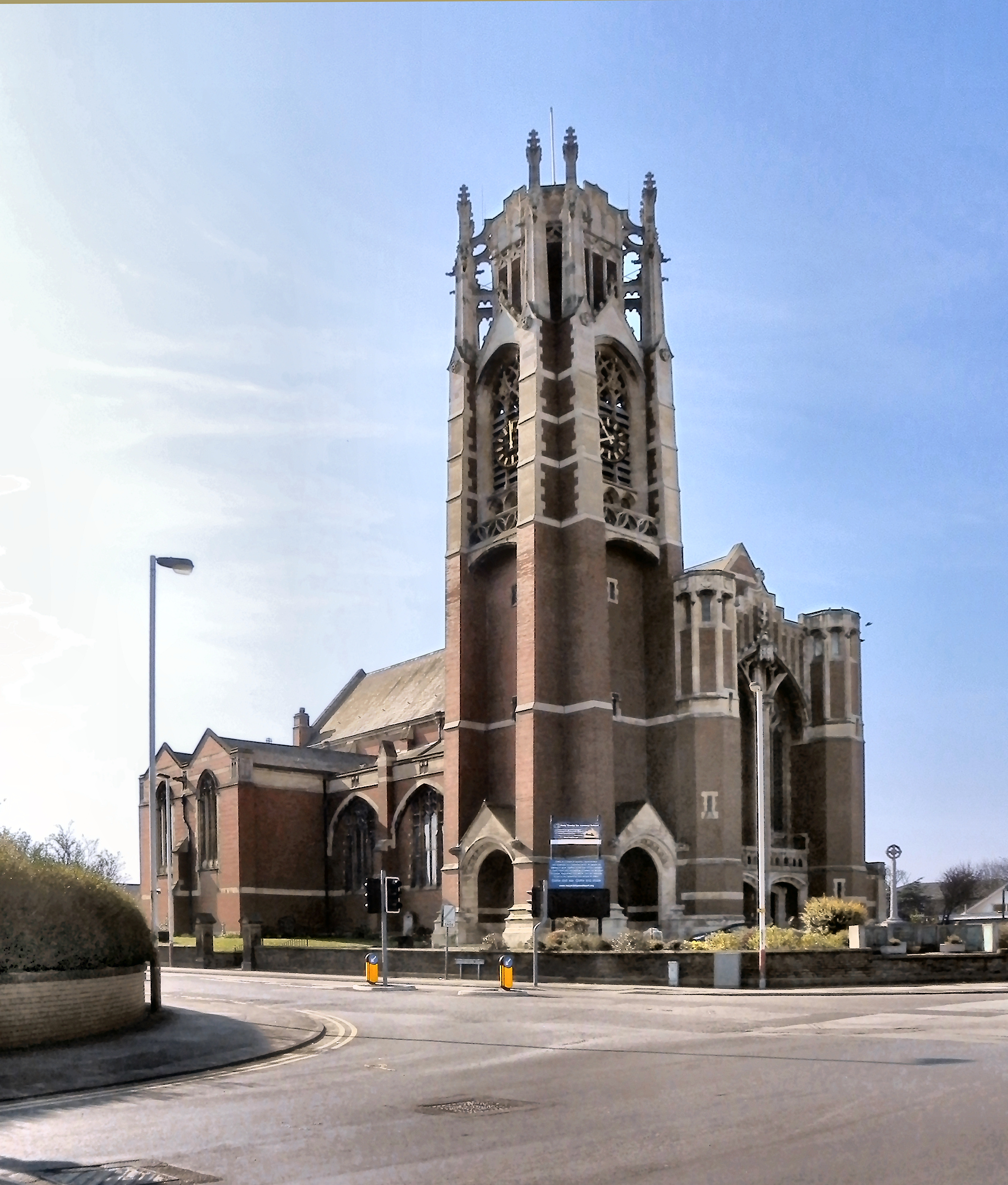
The church from the northwest

The previous church has a four-manual pipe organ of 1840 by Samuel Renn. In the present church there was also a four-manual organ, this was by Willis, and was followed in 1923 with an organ by Willis and Lewis, again with four manuals. Due to the poor condition of the Willis Pipe Organ, the console was refitted in 1982 by Makin and speakers installed in the organ loft, much of the original Willis pipework was moved to make way for the speakers. There is also a smaller two-manual Makin organ in the church. A new Makin Westmorland Custom 4–74 organ was installed in October 2010. It was dedicated by the Bishop of Warrington Rt. Rev. Richard Blackburn on Sunday 7 November. The main choir consists of boys and men, and there is also a chapel choir of women who sometimes join with the male choir. The choir sings at Sunday services, and also at a choral evensong on Wednesdays. Apart from the two cathedrals, it is the only choir in the diocese to regularly sing a full midweek choral evensong. In addition to its liturgical duties, the choir also performs in concerts, including in the Trinity Arts Festival. From 2008 to 2017, the director of music was Ian Wells, the former assistant organist at Liverpool Cathedral.

== Present day ==
Holy Trinity is an active Anglican parish church in the deanery of North Meols, the archdeaconry of Warrington, and the diocese of Liverpool. The church holds services on Sundays and during the week, including a choral evensong on Wednesdays. It has a Sunday club for children, and runs groups for Sea Scouts and Guides.

== Appraisal ==
On 15 November 1972 the church was designated as a Grade II* listed building. Grade II* is the middle of the three grades of listing recognised by English Heritage and is applied to "particularly important buildings of more than special interest". Only 5.5% of the listed buildings are included in this grade.

== See also ==
- Grade II* listed buildings in Merseyside
- Listed buildings in Southport
