= Listed buildings in Southport =

Southport is a seaside town in Sefton, Merseyside, England. It contains 175 buildings that are recorded in the National Heritage List for England as designated listed buildings. Of these, three are listed at Grade II*, the middle of the three grades, and the others are at Grade II, the lowest grade. There are no buildings listed at Grade I.

Southport did not develop as a town until the late 18th century. Before that it contained only small settlements and fishermen's cottages. Most of the listed buildings are located to the north of the present town centre and consist mainly of small houses, many of them in a single storey, rendered or roughcast, and with thatched or slated roofs. As the town developed and grew, its larger buildings were constructed, including villas, shops, churches, and public buildings. The major thoroughfare in the town is Lord Street, a wide road running north–south mainly with shops on the west side, and gardens and public buildings on the east side. A feature of the shops is that a high proportion are fronted by verandahs in cast iron and glass. Many of the shops are listed, and most of the verandahs are also listed, but separately from the shops. The listed public buildings on the east side of the road include the Town Hall, the Atkinson Art Gallery and Library, and the Southport Arts Centre. Also on this side of the road is an extensive War Memorial. A pier was built in 1859–60, and from 1885 the foreshore was developed, with its Marine Lake, which is surrounded by listed cast iron shelters. Also on the Promenade were built hotels, a hospital, and swimming baths.

== Key ==
Grade	Criteria
II*	Particularly important buildings of more than special interest
II	Buildings of national importance and special interest

== Buildings ==
Name and location	Photograph	Date	Notes	Grade
79 and 81 Roe Lane; 53.65310°N 2.97518°W		Late 17th to early 18th century (probable)	The farmhouse has been converted into two houses that are rendered with applied timber-framing and a thatched roof. The houses are in 1 1/2 storeys, and each house has two bays. The windows are horizontally-sliding sashes, those in the upper floor in half-dormers. There is an extension on the left side.	II
83 Roe Lane; 53.65317°N 2.97487°W	—	Late 17th to early 18th century (probable)	A farmhouse converted into a house, and since been enlarged. It is in painted brick with a slate roof, and has two storeys and two bays. The doorway on the right is in a gabled round-headed porch. The windows are horizontally-sliding sashes, and there is a later extension on the left.	II
Heron Cottage; 53.66604°N 2.97429°W	—	Late 17th to early 18th century (probable)	A rendered house with a thatched roof, extended in 1981. It is in a single storey with an attic and three bays. The windows are horizontally-sliding sashes, and in the attic is a shallow eyebrow window.	II
Thorntree Cottage; 53.65872°N 2.97779°W		Early to mid-18th century (probable)	A roughcast cottage with a slate roof in two storeys and one bay. On the right is a doorway with a canopy, and to the left is a sash window in each storey. The cottage has since been extended.	II
1, 3 and 4 Cotty's Brow; 53.66644°N 2.97160°W	—	1737	A row of three, formerly four, houses rendered with a slate roof and ridge tiles. They are in a single storey with five bays and seven windows on the front. Most of the windows are horizontally-sliding sashes.	II
Brick House Farmhouse; 53.66563°N 2.96903°W	—	Mid-18th century (probable)	Attached to the farmhouse are a stable block on the left, and a barn to the right, that were added in the late 19th century. They are in brick with slate roofs, the front of the farmhouse being pebbledashed. The buildings are in two storeys, the house having a symmetrical front with a central porch. Features include a round pitch hole under a gable in the stable, and a carriage door in the barn.	II
Cockle Dick's Nurseries; 53.66247°N 2.97912°W	—	18th century (probable)	A timber-framed building rebuilt in brick in about 1900, and extended. The roof of the main block is thatched, and the extension is slated. The building is in a single storey and four bays. It has a gabled porch and casement windows.	II
Second Cottage, Croston's Brow; 53.66638°N 2.97097°W	—	18th century (probable)	A rendered house with a slate roof, in a single storey and three bays. On the front are a gabled porch with two casement windows to the left and one to the right. There is a one-bay extension to the left.	II
54 Shellfield Road; 53.66842°N 2.96642°W	—	Mid- to late 18th century (probable)	A house with considerable later extensions. It is in rendered brick with a thatched roof and is in a single storey. The house consists of unequal single-depth units with a shallow outshut to most of the front.	II
1–4 Bank Nook; 53.66655°N 2.97715°W	—	Late 18th century (probable)	A row of four houses, rendered and roughcast with slate roofs. They have one storey, apart from No. 1, which has two. The houses have gabled porches, some have casement windows, others have horizontally-sliding sashes.	II
5 Bank Nook; 53.66671°N 2.97706°W	—	Late 18th century (probable)	A rendered house with a slate roof. It has a single storey with three windows, one fixed and two casements on the front. There is a gabled porch on the left side.	II
26 Knob Hall Lane; 53.66607°N 2.97418°W	—	Late 18th century (probable)	A rendered house with a slate roof in a single storey. On the front are two bow windows with a porch to the right. There is an extension at the rear.	II
28 Knob Hall Lane; 53.66610°N 2.97409°W	—	Late 18th century (probable)	A rendered house with a slate roof in a single storey. In the centre is a lean-to porch, flanked by horizontally-sliding sash windows.	II
123–127 Marshside Road; 53.66805°N 2.97178°W	—	Late 18th century (probable)	A row of three houses, the walls being rebuilt in brick in about 1926, and with thatched roofs. They are in a single storey, and each house has a three-bay front. The doorways and windows vary.	II
First Cottage. Croston's Brow; 53.66648°N 2.97106°W	—	Late 18th century (probable)	A house, partly roughcast, partly rendered with a slate roof. It is in a single storey and three bays. On the front are a gabled porch with one casement window to the left and two to the right.	II
14 Shellfield Road; 53.66761°N 2.96884°W	—	Late 18th century (probable)	A house in painted brick with a slate roof. It has a single storey and three bays, with a parallel extension at the rear. The windows are 20th-century casements.	II
30 Shellfield Road; 53.66791°N 2.96805°W	—	Late 18th century (probable)	A roughcast house with a tiled roof. It has a single storey and two bays with a wing at the rear. The windows are 20th-century casements.	II
43 Shellfield Road; 53.66845°N 2.96746°W	—	Late 18th century (probable)	A roughcast house with a slate roof. It is in a single storey, and has a three-bay front, a single-bay extension on the left, and a 20th-century wing at the rear. On the front is a flat-roofed porch.	II
64 Shellfield Road; 53.66868°N 2.96570°W	—	Late 18th century (probable)	A rendered house with a slate roof. It is in a single storey and two bays. The windows are 20th-century casements.	II
98–104 Shellfield Road; 53.66961°N 2.96309°W	—	Late 18th century (probable)	A row of four rendered houses with a slate roofs stepping up from the right. They are in a single storey and have openings that have been altered.	II
119 Shellfield Road; 53.67011°N 2.96148°W	—	Late 18th century (probable)	A rendered house with a slate roof. It has two storeys and is in a single bay. In the ground floor is a square-headed doorway with a three-light casement window to the left. The upper storey contains a seven-light window with a horizontally-sliding sash window in the centre.	II
Aquarius Cottage; 53.66837°N 2.96582°W	—	Late 18th century (probable)	A rendered house with a composition tile roof, possibly originally two dwellings. It is in a single storey and four bays. The windows date from the 20th century and consist of a bow window and casements.	II
Chara Cottage; 53.66998°N 2.96234°W	—	Late 18th century (probable)	A pair of rendered houses with a slate roof. They are in a single storey and four bays. The windows are 20th-century casements.	II
Kingfisher Cottage; 53.66836°N 2.96657°W	—	Late 18th century (probable)	A rendered house with a slate roof. It is in a single storey, and has a three-bay front with a small gabled porch. The windows are 20th-century casements.	II
Priory Cottage; 53.66873°N 2.96663°W	—	Late 18th century (probable)	A pair of rendered houses with a slate roof. They are in a single storey and five bays. On the front are bowed casement windows, and casement windows with transoms.	II
Rose Cottage; 53.66851°N 2.96615°W	—	Late 18th century (probable)	A rendered house with a slate roof extended to the rear in the 20th century. It is in a single storey with a two-bay front. The windows are 20th-century casements.	II
The Haven; 53.66897°N 2.96532°W	—	Late 18th century (probable)	A rendered house with a slate roof with a 20th-century extension to the rear. It is in a single storey and three bays. The windows are casements.	II
Willow Cottage; 53.66820°N 2.96726°W	—	Late 18th century (probable)	A pair of houses, roughcast with a slate roof. They are in a single storey and have four bays, with an outshut at the right and extensions to the rear. All the windows are 20th-century casements.	II
6 and 6A Bank Nook; 53.66679°N 2.97727°W	—	Late 18th to early 19th century	Two rendered houses with slate roofs. No. 6 has two storeys and a lean-to porch. No. 6A is in a single storey and has a flat-roofed porch.	II
7 Bank Nook; 53.66669°N 2.97740°W	—	Late 18th to early 19th century	A house, roughcast on brick, with a slate roof. It has an L-shaped plan and is in a single storey. It has a gabled porch and casement windows.	II
109 and 111 Marshside Road; 53.66713°N 2.97109°W	—	Late 18th to early 19th century	Originally a pair of fisherman's cottages, later altered. They are in rendered brick with slate roofs. The cottages are in a single storey with small gabled porches, and the windows are 20th-century casements.	II
19 Threlfalls Lane; 53.66275°N 2.97495°W	—	Late 18th to early 19th century	A rendered house with a slate roof. It is in a single storey and two bays, with an extension on the left. On the front are a gabled porch, a casement window and an oriel window.	II
21 and 23 Threlfalls Lane; 53.66280°N 2.97486°W	—	Late 18th to early 19th century	A pair of rendered houses with slate roofs. They are in two storeys and each house has one bay, with a small wing added to the left house. The windows are mainly casements, with an oriel window and a dormer.	II
76 Shellfield Road; 53.66903°N 2.96484°W	—	c. 1800 (probable)	A rendered house with a slate roof. It is in a single storey and has a central gabled porch flanked by three-light casement windows.	II
78 Shellfield Road; 53.66907°N 2.96470°W	—	c. 1800 (probable)	A rendered house with a slate roof. It is in a single storey and a three-bay front with a doorway and casement windows.	II
Shellcott; 53.66935°N 2.96485°W	—	c. 1800	A rendered house with a slate roof. It is in a single storey and has a central doorway flanked by casement windows, those on the left in a bow window.	II
57–61 Shellfield Road; 53.66897°N 2.96586°W	—	1811	A row of three rendered houses with a slate roof. They have two storeys and three bays. On the front are three doorways, a bow window, and casement windows.	II
Wellington Terrace; 53.64440°N 3.01137°W	—	1818	A terrace of eight stuccoed houses with slate roofs and ridge tiles. They are in two storeys and 16 bays. In the front are round-headed doorways and two-storey canted bay windows; most of the windows are sashes.	II
The Willows; 53.64297°N 3.01255°W	—	c. 1824	Originally a villa, later divided into three dwellings, and extended in 1924. It is stuccoed with stone quoins and a hipped slate roof. The house has an irregular plan, is in two storeys, and has a symmetrical main front of seven bays. The central three bays project forward, contain a full-length bay window and at the top an open pediment.	II
72 and 74 Shellfield Road; 53.66898°N 2.96504°W	—	Early 19th century (probable)	A pair of rendered houses with slate roofs. They are in a single storey, and each house has a three-bay front with a central doorway flanked by canted bay windows.	II
85 and 87 Shellfield Road; 53.66974°N 2.96362°W	—	Early 19th century	A pair of rendered houses with a slate roof. They are in two storeys, and the windows include casements, horizontally-sliding sashes, and a bow window.	II
Cheshire Lines Inn; 53.64381°N 3.01021°W	—	Early 19th century	Originally an inn and livery stable, later a public house and an adjoining house. The building is roughcast with a slate roof, it has a U-shaped plan and is in two storeys. The inn has a doorway between a continuous window on the ground floor, and above is a central gable over an inscribed plaque. To the right is a carriage entrance, and then a two-storey house in two bays with a central porch.	II
156 Lord Street; 53.65012°N 3.00131°W	—	c. 1827 (probable)	A rendered villa with a hipped slate roof. It is in two storeys and has a central doorway with pilasters and a frieze. This is flanked by bay windows. All the windows are divided into lights with Tudor arches.	II
11 and 13 Manchester Road; 53.65098°N 2.99668°W	—	c. 1830–40	A pair of brick houses with sandstone dressings and a slate roof. They are in two storeys with high basements, and each house has two bays. The doorways in the central bays are approached by six steps. In the outer bays are two-storey bay windows.	II
Bold Hotel; 53.65117°N 3.00095°W		1832	Originally a house, later a hotel, by Thomas Mawdsley in late Georgian style. The hotel is stuccoed with a slate roof, is in three storeys with attics and has a five-bay symmetrical front. In the centre is a Greek Doric porch with pairs of fluted columns flanking the entrance, and an entablature with triglyphs, guttae and a moulded cornice. In the outer bays are two-storey bay windows.	II
9 Manchester Road; 53.65113°N 2.99686°W	—	1835	A stuccoed villa with a hipped slate roof in Georgian style. It is in two storeys and a three-bay symmetrical front, with small side wings and a rear extension. The middle bay projects forward and has a porch with pilasters, a plain frieze, and a moulded cornice. The central doorway, and the doorways in the side wings, have fanlights, and the windows are sashes.	II
Stable and coach house, 9 Manchester Road; 53.65135°N 2.99637°W	—	c. 1835–40	The former stable and couch house are joined by a screen wall. They are in brick with hipped slate roofs. Each is in two storeys and a single bay, one with a carriage doorway, the other with inserted garage doors, and both with a loading door above. In the wall is a round-headed doorway.	II
15 and 17 Manchester Road; 53.65074°N 2.99627°W	—	c. 1835–45	A pair of stuccoed villas with a hipped slate roof in Italianate style. They are in two storeys and six bays, the outer bays projecting forward forming a U-shaped plan. Between these bays is a loggia incorporating round-headed porches and cross-casement windows. The other windows are sashes, those in the lower storey of the outer bays in canted bay windows.	II
Starr Hills; 53.65123°N 2.99701°W	—	1837	A villa, pebbledashed on brick, with a slate roof in Gothick style. It has two storeys and a near-symmetrical three-bay front. In the centre is a Tudor arched porch with pilasters, a moulded cornice, and acorn finials. The doorway also has a Tudor arch. To the right of it is a bay window; the other windows have three lights.	II
Hoghton Arms Hotel; 53.64765°N 3.00255°W		1838	A hotel on a corner site by Richard Wright, stuccoed on brick, with stone dressings and a slate roof. It is in three storeys and has three bays on each front. Its features include bay windows, a doorway with fluted columns and an entablature, corner pilasters, and quoins.	II
Former Victoria Baths; 53.65057°N 3.00661°W		1839	The baths were remodelled in about 1870 and have since closed and used for other purposes. The building is in sandstone with roofs of slate and other materials, and is in French Classical style. It consists of a two-storey three-bay block flanked by two single-storey six-bay wings that are separated by pilasters and contain round-headed openings. The main block has two round-headed doorways, each flanked by paired Roman Doric columns. In the upper floor are more columns, pilasters, and a segmental pediment, above which is a pavilion roof containing a bull's-eye window.	II
Boothroyds; 53.64809°N 3.00633°W	—	c. 1840	Shops that were extended to the right in about 1870, both in five bays. The left part is in Neoclassical style, is stuccoed and in two storeys. It contains pilasters, a plain frieze, a moulded cornice and a parapet. The right part is in brick with three storeys, and has lateral pilasters and a central pediment. A verandah on cast iron columns stretches along the ground floor.	II
Byng House; 53.64905°N 3.00811°W	—	1840–41	Originally a house, later the Claremont Hotel, and then a convalescent home with an extension to the rear. It is stuccoed with a Welsh slate roof, and is in Neoclassical style. The front is symmetrical with side-wings, it has three storeys and three bays. The central doorway has a porch with four Ionic columns, an entablature with a cornice, a balustraded parapet, and a balcony. Leading to this is a French window flanked by Ionic columns, and above it is another balcony and a three-light window. The outer bays have two-storey bay windows surmounted by a balcony.	II
St Marie's Church; 53.65252°N 3.00222°W		1841	A Roman Catholic church by A. W. N. Pugin and extended and much altered since. It is in Decorated style with a façade in Portland stone with sandstone dressings. The church consists of a nave with aisles and a three-sided apse. The façade includes two gabled entrances, above which are three lancet windows, a rose window and a gabled bellcote.	II
Trinity Cottage; 53.65059°N 2.99608°W	—	1842	A stuccoed villa with a slate roof in Regency style. It is in two storeys with a symmetrical three-bay front. In the centre is a Tudor arched porch and a doorway with a fanlight. Flanking this are bay windows, and in the upper floor are three-light windows, all with Tudor-arched lights.	II
Mount Cambria; 53.65048°N 2.99583°W	—	c. 1842–45	A pair of stuccoed villas with a slate roof in Regency style, later converted into flats. They are in two storeys, and each house has a symmetrical three-bay front. In the centre of each house is a Tudor arched porch and a doorway with a fanlight. Flanking these are two-storey bay windows; all the windows have Tudor-arched lights.	II
Heaton Mount; 53.65038°N 2.99554°W	—	c. 1842–45	A pair of stuccoed semi-detached houses with a slate roof in Regency style. They are in two storeys, and each house has a two-bay front. The central bays contain a Tudor arched porch and a doorway with a fanlight. The outer bays contain two-storey bay windows with Tudor-arched lights and gablets.	II
31 and 33 Manchester Road; 53.65032°N 2.99529°W	—	c. 1842–50 (probable)	A pair of stuccoed semi-detached houses with a slate roof. They are in two storeys, and each house has a two-bay front. The central bays contain lean-to porches with tiled roofs. Flanking these are bay windows, also with tiled roofs. In the upper storeys are windows with Tudor arched lights and gablets.	II
45A, 46, 47 and 48 Promenade; 53.65155°N 3.00555°W	—	1840s (probable)	A terrace of four houses, later converted into flats. They are rendered on brick with slate roofs, and are in three storeys, the upper floors being jettied, and have a ten-bay front. In the ground floor are Tuscan pilasters, a frieze and a cornice, round-headed doorways, and bay windows that are alternately single- and three-storeyed.	II
49 and 50 Promenade; 53.65179°N 3.00526°W	—	1840s (probable)	A pair of houses converted into flats, rendered on brick, with a slate roof. They are in three storeys, each house has a three-bay front, and a central doorway in a pilastered architrave with a plain frieze and a moulded cornice. The doorways are flanked by two-storey bay windows, and in the top floor are three windows.	II
Stanley Terrace and Victoria public house 53.65112°N 3.00605°W		1840s (probable)	Originally a row of four houses, later converted into a public house and flats. The building is in brick with sandstone dressings and a slate roof. It has three storeys and ten bays. In the ground floor are Tuscan pilasters, a frieze and a cornice, doorways that are mostly round-headed, and bay windows, some of which rise to the second storey. In the top floor are round-headed windows. All the windows are sashes.	II
Waterloo Terrace; 53.64930°N 3.00785°W	—	1840s (probable)	An L-shaped block of seven houses and a hotel, some facing the Promenade, and the others forming a wing at right angles. They are in two storeys with cellars and attics, and have ten bays facing the Promenade and nine in the wing. The block is partly stuccoed and partly roughcast. Features include two-storey bay windows, pilastered porches with entablatures and cornices, and four round-headed dormers.	II
57A Portland Street; 53.64162°N 3.00356°W	—	1848	This originated as the first terminus station of the Liverpool, Crosby and Southport Railway, and was later converted for use by a club. It is in brick with a slate roof, and has two storeys. The front facing the railway has a central Tudor arched doorway, and two sash windows on each floor. Above the door is a large stone plaque.	II
22 and 24 Hoghton Street; 53.64830°N 3.00103°W	—	Mid-19th century	A pair of Italianate villas in brick with stone dressings and a slate roof. They have a U-shaped plan, and are in two storeys and six bays. The outer bays project forward with quoins, and each has a bay window, and a pediment. Along the top of the building is a cornice, and the windows are sashes.	II
92, 94 and 96 King Street; 53.64434°N 3.01009°W	—	Mid-19th century	Nos. 92 and 94 are a pair of brick houses with a slate roof, in two storeys and with two bays each. Over the central bays is an open pediment with a blind arch below flanked by bay windows. The outer narrow bays contain round-headed doorways. No. 96 projects forward, has two storeys, two bays, and a bay window.	II
13 Lord Street West; 53.64291°N 3.01500°W	—	Mid-19th century (probable)	A house, later divided into flats, in brick with sandstone dressings and a hipped slate roof. It is in late Georgian style, with two storeys and three symmetrical bays. In the centre is a doorway with pilasters, an entablature, and a cornice. At the top of the house is a plain frieze, and a moulded cornice, and the windows are sashes.	II
Pavilion, Municipal Gardens; 53.64776°N 3.00583°W	—	Mid-19th century (probable)	The pavilion is in Classical style, and built in painted stone. It consists of a single cell with a round-headed doorway with a fanlight on the north side. On each side are two Doric columns, and at the top is a frieze and a dentilled cornice.	II
Promenade Hospital; 53.65404°N 3.00256°W		1852–53	The former hospital was initially designed by Thomas Withnell, and there were extensions in 1862, 1881–83, and later. The front range is in red brick with terracotta and stone dressings and slate roofs, and is in North German Gothic Revival style. It has three storeys with attics and 15 bays, with crow-stepped gables at the ends. Other features include two octagonal stair turrets with octagonal roofs, spires and finials, and four dormers with elaborate gables and finials.	II
Town Hall; 53.64750°N 3.00560°W		1852–53	The town hall by Thomas Withnell is in Palladian style. It is stuccoed with a slate roof, it has two storeys with a basement, and a symmetrical front in seven bays with pilasters. In the centre is a double parallel staircase with a balustraded parapet. The porch has fluted Doric columns, a triglyph frieze, a cornice, and a balustraded parapet. At the top of the building in a pediment with sculpted figures in the tympanum. The windows in the ground floor are round-headed, and those in the upper floor have flat heads.	II
Royal Clifton Hotel; 53.64698°N 3.01095°W		1853–54	The original part of the hotel is by Thomas Withnell, it was extended in 1865 and later included two adjacent houses. The hotel is stoccoed with slate roofs, it has three storeys with cellars and attics and a total of 16 bays. A large conservatory was added in the 20th century. Other features include two-storey bay windows, a square tower with a pyramidal roof, a circular turret with a conical roof, and some shaped gables.	II
Southport Pier; 53.65350°N 3.01604°W		1859–60	The pier, originally designed by J. W. Brunlees, was extended in 1864 and 1868, shortened in 1897, and has suffered two fires. The Southport Pier Tramway was installed in 1864, and a new pavilion was built in 2001–02 to replace an earlier pavilion destroyed by fire in 1933. The pier is 3,650 feet (1,113 m) long, it is built in cast iron with four rows of columns carrying girders, and has a wooden deck.	II
Conservatory; 53.65571°N 2.98811°W	—	Mid- to late 19th century	The conservatory was originally at a house in Lord Street and was moved into Hesketh Park in 1878. It is in cast iron and glass on a brick plinth with sandstone coping. It has a wider central section flanked by aisles, and has a façade of three gables, the central gable being the largest.	II
Hoghton House; 53.65001°N 2.99771°W	—	Mid- to late 19th century	A pair of villas in brick with stone dressings and slate roofs. They have a T-shaped plan, with a main block in two storeys and four bays flanked by three-storey canted bay windows. In the right bay is a round-headed doorway with a shell canopy; the left bay is similar with the doorway replaced by a window. The windows are sashes with wedge lintels.	II
221–233 Lord Street; 53.64728°N 3.00773°W	—	c. 1860–90 (probable)	Four shops of separate builds, the first three in two storeys and the fourth in three. All have oriel windows in the first floor. The first is in stone with an open pediment. The others are in brick with stone and terracotta dressings. The second has a pedimented gable and the fourth has a truncated pyramidal roof.. In front is a cast iron verandah.	II
Fernley drinking fountain 53.64951°N 3.00847°W		1861	The drinking fountain is mainly in sandstone. It consists of a central pillar with free-standing granite colonnettes on marble feet. On the top is a canopy with a semicircular centre and a large finial. The east side has coloured mosaic decoration and a marble bowl. The fountain stands on a square base and is surrounded by iron railings.	II
Lord Street West United Reformed Church; 53.64361°N 3.01245°W		1861–62	Originally a Congregational church by Edward Walters in Decorated style, later a United Reformed Church. It was gutted by fire in 1964, and restored. The church is in sandstone with a slate roof. It consists of a nave, a south aisle, a chancel, a vestry, and a northwest tower, from which the spire, apart from its base, has been removed. The tracery is in Geometrical style.	II
Portland Hall; 53.64298°N 3.00546°W	—	1863	Built as a museum then used for other purposes including a concert hall before being converted into a private dwelling. It is in brick with sandstone dressings and a slate roof, and is in late Georgian style. The façade is in two storeys and an attic with a symmetrical three-bay front. The central doorway has a pediment on consoles and a fanlight, and the windows have architraves. The gable is pedimented and contains a four-light window. A large hall extends to the rear.	II
Cemetery Chapels; 53.63477°N 2.99850°W		c. 1865	A pair of chapels linked by cloisters and with a central clock tower by Blackwell, Son and Booth in High Victorian Gothic style. They are in sandstone with slate roofs. The tower is in three stages with clock faces in the top stage, turrets on the corners and a saddleback roof.	II
45 Park Crescent; 53.65866°N 2.98630°W	—	c. 1870	A brick villa with sandstone dressings and a hipped slate roof. It is in three storeys with a basement and has three bays. The left bay consists of a full-height bow window with a conical roof. The right bay projects forward and is gabled. In the centre is a porch with a parapet, and on the left side is a five-sided two-storey bay window.	II
Salfordian; 53.65837°N 2.98487°W		c. 1870	A villa later used as a hotel. It is in brick with sandstone dressings and a slate roof. The building is in three storeys with a basement and a three-bay front. The left bay projects forward and is gabled, the right bay consists of a bow window that rises to a turret with a conical roof. Steps lead up to a central doorway.	II
West Dene; 53.65854°N 2.98569°W	—	c. 1870	A villa, later used as a children's home, in Italianate style. It is in brick with The building has three storeys and a cellar, and a front of three unequal bays. Over the ground floor is a slate-roofed canopy. Steps lead up to a central round-headed doorway with a fanlight. The left bay contains a full-height bay window, and the windows are sashes.	II
Rest Haven; 53.65852°N 2.98572°W	—	c. 1870	A villa, later used as a rest home, in Italianate style. It is in brick on a stone plinth with sandstone dressings and a hipped slate roof. The building is mainly in two storeys with a cellar, and a front of four unequal bays. Steps lead up to a round-headed doorway with a fanlight. The right bay is canted and rises to form a turret with a third storey, a balcony, and a mansard roof. The left bay is also canted, is in two storeys, and has an octagonal roof.	II
Hoghton Chambers; 53.64870°N 3.00018°W	—	c. 1870–80 (probable)	A Gothic villa on a corner site in brick with sandstone dressings and a slate roof. It is in two storeys and has three bays and two gables with decorative bargeboards on each front. On the entrance front is a bay window and an arched doorway with a gable above. The windows are sashes.	II
Astronomical Observatory; 53.65704°N 2.98693°W		1871	In Hesketh Park, and also known as the Fernley Observatory, it is in brick with stone dressings, a timber upper floor, and a dome. In the ground floor is a pair of round-arched entrances, and above it is painted to resemble timber-framing with decorated panels.	II
Arts Centre and arcade entrance 53.64717°N 3.00602°W		1873–74	The assembly hall by Maxwell and Tuke in French Renaissance style is in sandstone with a slate roof. It is in two storeys with an attic. On the right side of the front is a tall clock tower, on the left is a smaller tower, and in the centre is a ventilation tower. On the ground floor is a porte-cochère and an arcade forming a loggia. The upper floor contains round-headed windows. On the left of the hall is the entrance to Cambridge Arcade, which is included in the listing.	II
St George's Church; 53.64951°N 3.00226°W		1873–74	Originally a Presbyterian Church by Thomas Wylie in Gothic Revival style, later a United Reformed Church. It is in sandstone with a slate roof. The church consists of a five-bay nave and has a steeple at the west end with a tall broach spire.	II
Former Roman Catholic Cemetery Chapel; 53.63536°N 2.99872°W		1865 (probable)	A disused chapel by Blackwell, Son and Booth in Early English style. It is in sandstone with a slate roof, and has a porch and an apse.	II
137–141 Lord Street; 53.64629°N 3.00964°W	—	Late 19th century	Shops and a commercial building in plastered brick with a slate roof. It is in three storeys with a shop front in the ground floor, and above are three-light windows in each floor. In front is a cast iron and glass verandah with an elaborately decorated pediment in the centre.	II
163–177 Lord Street; 53.64666°N 3.00895°W	—	Late 19th century	Shops and a commercial building in brick with sandstone dressings, in three storeys and eight bays. In the ground floor are shop fronts, the middle floor contains canted oriel windows, and at the top of the building is a machicolated cornice and false gablets. In front is a cast iron and glass verandah.	II
207–213 Lord Street; 53.64704°N 3.00815°W	—	Late 19th century	Shops and a commercial building in brick with sandstone dressings and a slate roof. It has four storeys and two bays. The ground floor contains shop fronts and has a cast iron verandah. In the first floor are two canted oriel windows and two small windows; in the second floor are four round-headed windows; and in the top floor are two square windows in an architrave of paired colonettes with a cornice, above which are shaped gables.	II
387 Lord Street; 53.64910°N 3.00454°W	—	Late 19th century	A shop, stuccoed on brick, with a slate roof, in the style of an Italian palazzo. It has three storeys and a front of two symmetrical bays. In the ground floor is a shop front and a verandah on cast iron columns. In each of the upper floors are two arcades of windows, in the first floor with round heads, and in the top floor with segmental heads. At the top of the building is a parapet of pierced roundels.	II
Prince of Wales Hotel; 53.64558°N 3.00912°W		1876–77	A hotel by E. Kenrick in Domestic Gothic style, later expanded. It is in brick with sandstone dressings and a slate mansard roof. The hotel is in three storeys with basements and attics on an L-shaped corner site with rear extensions. Features include a porte-cochère with pinnacles, bay windows, oriel windows and gabled dormers. The area wrought iron railings are included in the listing.	II
Atkinson Art Gallery and Library; 53.64701°N 3.00648°W	—	1876–88	The gallery was designed by Waddington and Sons of Burnley in Neoclassical style. The Building is in sandstone with a slate roof, in three storeys and three bays. The central bay projects forward, has an entrance flanked by Corinthian columns and a carved roundel above it. At the top is a pediment with a carved tympanum, and behind is a pair of domed turrets and a pavilion roof with cresting. Across the front of the building are carved panels.	II
479 and 481 Lord Street; 53.64995°N 3.00307°W		1877	A shop by MacGibbon and Ross in red brick with dressings of glazed blue brick and sandstone and with a slate roof. It has three storeys with a shop front and a verandah in the ground floor. The floors above are elaborately decorated with a large round arch in the centre with a carved keystone. At the top is a cornice on brackets, and a parapet with a central pedimented upstand containing a sculpted female head.	II
Walls and gate piers, Prince of Wales Hotel; 53.64596°N 3.00938°W		1877 (probable)	This consists of the boundary wall with three pairs of gate piers and a semicircular garden wall. The walls are in brick with sandstone coping and the gate piers are Gothic monoliths. In the wall is a carved stone banner.	II
Masonic Hall; 53.64357°N 3.01143°W		1878–79	Originally a Free Methodist Church in Italianate style by Maxwell and Tuke, it was extended in 1900 by G. E. Bolshaw. The building is in sandstone with a slate roof. The entrance front contains a portico on columns, above which is an arcade of five round-headed windows, and a pediment flanked by a pierced parapet. The attached single-storey former Sunday school at the rear is included in the listing.	II
Leyland Road Methodist Church; 53.65084°N 2.98623°W		1878–80	A Methodist church by William Waddington in Early English style. It is in sandstone with slate roofs, and consists of a nave, transepts, a chancel, a northwest porch, and a southwest steeple incorporating another porch. The windows are lancets.	II
St Luke's Church; 53.64688°N 2.98521°W		1878–80	A church by Mellor and Simpson in Early English style. It is in red brick with blue brick dressings and slate roofs. The church consists of a nave with a baptistry and a clerestory, aisles, and a chancel with transepts and a round apse. There is a bellcote at the junction of the nave and chancel, and the windows are lancets.	II
Southport Library; 53.64686°N 3.00664°W		1879	Built as the Manchester and Liverpool District Bank on a corner site, and later incorporated into the Atkinson Gallery, it is in Renaissance style, and built in sandstone with a slate roof. It has three storeys and attics, and fronts of three and seven bays. Each floor contains round-headed windows and entrances. At the top is a balustraded parapet with a pedimented attic window on each side.	II
433–453 Lord Street; 53.64969°N 3.00367°W	—	c. 1880–90	A row of shops with a verandah in Neo-Tudor style. They are in brick with some tile-hanging and sandstone dressings. The building is in four storeys and 5 1/2 bays. The five full bays have gables, the central three being jettied, and contain oriel windows.	II
469–473 Lord Street; 53.64969°N 3.00367°W	—	c. 1880–90 (probable)	A pair of shops in brick with some tile-hanging and a slate roof. They are in three storeys with attics and two bays. In the ground floor are shop fronts and a verandah on cast iron columns. The first and second floors contain bay windows, and above the attics are gables with applied timber-framing.	II
Evangelical Pentecostal Church; 53.65877°N 2.98773°W		1881–85	This was originally a house, it is in Italianate style, and built in brick with stone dressings and a slate roof. The building is in two storeys with a basement and attics, and has a three-bay front. Steps lead up to a central doorway with a pillared porch. On the left is a bow window and on the right is a bay window. The other windows are sashes. It became a church in 1952, but in 2006 another building elsewhere in Southport replaced it.	II
Albany Buildings; 53.64854°N 3.00537°W	—	1882–84	Shops and offices by E. W. Johnson in eclectic style. They are in brick with sandstone dressings, some tiles and timber-framing, and a slate roof. There are three storeys with attics and five bays, the central bay being narrow. Features include shop fronts and a verandah in the ground floor and oriel windows. At the top, the outer bays have timber-framed gables with balconies, the adjacent bays have gables with crockets and oculi, and in the central bay is a pinnacled balustrade.	II
Royal Buildings; 53.64619°N 3.00977°W		1883	A commercial building in Italianate style. It is in sandstone with a slate roof and a verandah on cast iron columns. The building is symmetrical in three storeys and eight bays. The ground floor contains modern shop fronts, the upper storeys contain round-headed windows in pairs and pilasters. At the top is a pediment containing a roundel and carving.	II
Verandah, 393–421 Lord Street; 53.64927°N 3.00416°W	—	1883	The verandah is in front of a row of shops and is in nine bays. It consists of decorative cast iron columns supporting a curved glass roof.	II
143–161 Lord Street; 53.64647°N 3.00930°W	—	1883–84	A commercial building by T. Hodge with later alterations and a verandah added in 1902. It is in brick with stone dressings and a slate roof, and has three storeys. In the ground floor are shop fronts, and above the windows are arranged in groups of three, those in the middle floor having round heads, and those above with segmental heads.	II
335 and 337 Lord Street; 53.64854°N 3.00560°W	—	1884	A shop with offices above in brick with stone and terracotta dressings and a slate roof. It is in three storeys and has 2 1/2 bays. The main bays have a shop front and a verandah in the ground floor, a large canted bay window in the first floor, elliptical-headed windows in the top floor and, at the top, a pilastered upstand flanked by a balustraded parapet. The small bay to the left has an entrance in the ground floor, and lancet windows above.	II
St Philip and St Paul's Church; 53.64046°N 2.99403°W		1885–87	A church by R. E. Tolson in the style of the 13th century. It is in sandstone with slate roofs. The church consists of a nave with a clerestory, aisles, a south baptistry, paired transepts, a chancel, a south vestry, and a southwest tower containing a porch. The four-stage tower has a balustraded parapet with pyramidal corner pinnacles.	II
Queen's Hotel; 53.65235°N 3.00471°W	—	1886	The hotel is in sandstone with a slate roof on a corner site, and is in Renaissance style. Extensions to the rear have given it a U-shaped plan. The front has three storeys and four bays. The doorway is in the third bay, it is approached up steps, and has a porch with Corinthian columns and a pediment. To the left is a bow window, and the outer bays contain two-storey bay windows. At the top of the building is a frieze, a modillioned cornice and a balustraded parapet with urns.	II
Southbank Road Methodist Church; 53.63881°N 2.99491°W		1887–88	A Methodist church by Waddington and Son in Romanesque Revival style, built in brick with sandstone dressings and a slate roof. It consists of a nave, transepts, a chancel with an apse, a porch, and a tower. The tower is octagonal with a steep octagonal roof and a finial.	II
Lifeboat Memorial, Promenade; 53.64849°N 3.00964°W		1888	The memorial commemorates the loss of crew of the Eliza Fernley in 1886 and other events, including further lifeboat achievements, and the Golden Jubilee of Queen Victoria. It is in grey granite and consists of a plinth with colonettes and plaques standing on three steps. On the plinth is an obelisk with chamfered corners.	II
St Philip's Vicarage; 53.64020°N 2.99346°W	—	1888	The vicarage by G. S. Packer in Gothic style. It is in sandstone with freestone dressings and a slate roof. The building has an L-shaped plan in two storeys with a cellar and attics, and three bays. The outer bays are gabled with ball finials, and in the centre is an arched doorway approached by steps.	II
Midland Bank; 53.64851°N 3.00576°W		1888–89	Designed for the Preston Bank by E. W. Johnson, the bank is in Roman Corinthian style, and built in sandstone and granite. It has a front of three bays, the central portico flanked by paired columns carrying a pediment with a coat of arms and surmounted by a statue of Britannia. Each outer pilastered bay contains a panel with a carved coat of arms and, at the top, is a balustraded parapet with gadrooned urns. Inside is a dome carried on ten columns.	II*
Lifeboat Memorial, Cemetery; 53.63576°N 2.99791°W		c. 1888–90 (probable)	A memorial to the 14 men from Southport who lost their lives in the Eliza Fernley disaster in 1886. It is in sandstone with marble plaques, designed by E. W. Johnson and sculpted by Thomas Robinson. It is in the form of a tomb, with a representation of a broken mast on the top.	II
Debenham's; 53.65071°N 3.00173°W	—	c. 1888–1900	A departmental store in brick with dressings in sandstone and terracotta, and a slate roof. It is mainly in three storeys and has a 12-bay front. In the ground floor are shop windows and two openings, with a ten-bay verandah in front. In the second floor all bays contain oriel windows. The outer bays have attics, are gabled with finials, and have another oriel window in the upper storey.	II
Normanshurst; 53.64284°N 3.01526°W	—	1889	A villa later converted into flats, in red brick with dressings in yellow brick, terracotta and sandstone. It is in two storeys with a basement and a symmetrical three-bay front. The outer bays have a sash window in each floor above which is a Lombard frieze, and a gable with Moorish features that includes an arcaded band, tourelles with mosaic panels, and an upstand with a semicircular pediment and ball finials. The central bay has a doorway with a semicircular arch, above which is a balustraded balcony, two semicircular arches, and a balustraded parapet.	II
Church House; 53.64720°N 2.99592°W		1890	Originally a Primitive Methodist Sunday School, by F. W. Dixon in eclectic style, later used as a college. It is in brick with sandstone dressings and a slate roof, in two storeys and nine bays. There are three shaped gables, the central being the largest with pilasters, and with balustraded parapets between.	II
Melton Grange; 53.66046°N 2.97645°W	—	c. 1890 (probable)	A villa in eclectic style, built in brick with dressings in sandstone and terracotta and a tiled roof. It is in two storeys with an attic and is in five bays. Features include two turrets with octagonal roofs, steps leading up to a central doorway with a balustrade in front and a canopy above, oriel windows, dormers and an arch between chimney stacks.	II
Scarisbrick Hotel; 53.64743°N 3.00750°W		1890–91	A hotel by James E Sanders in brick with stone dressings, in five storeys and four bays. On the ground floor are shops, the entrance, and a cast iron verandah. Some of the windows in the upper floors are oriels. At the top of the hotel is a balustraded parapet, and on the roof is an octagonal turret with an embattled parapet and a flagstaff.	II
423–431 Lord Street; 53.64952°N 3.00387°W	—	1890–92	Designed by E. W. Johnson as shops in Jacobean style, later converted into the Manchester and County Bank, then back to shops. The building is in sandstone with a green slate mansard roof. There are 2 1/2 storeys and four bays. In the ground floor are shop fronts and a verandah. The left bay has an oriel window and a tower. The other bays have bay windows in the first floor above which are dormers with Dutch gables.	II
287–291 Lord Street; 53.64798°N 3.00653°W	—	c. 1890–1900 (probable)	Rendered shops with a tiled roof in Neo-Tudor style. They are in two storeys and two bays. In the ground floor are shop fronts and a verandah on cast iron columns, and in the first floor are shallow oriel windows. At the top are two gables with applied decorative timber-framing, bargeboards, and finials.	II
Leyland Road Methodist Church Hall; 53.65113°N 2.98659°W		c. 1891	Built as a Sunday school and caretaker's house, later a church hall, it is in Gothic style, in sandstone with slate roofs. The building consists of a large hall with a small south wing and an apsidal west wing.	II
245–251 Lord Street; 53.64758°N 3.00731°W		1892	A shop with flats above in brick with stone dressings and a slate roof in Renaissance style. It is in three storeys with an attic and two bays. On the front are painted stone bands, pilasters rising to pinnacles, between which are windows with decorated gables. In the first floor are two oriel windows with elaborate parapets, and in the storey above are four windows with decorated elliptical heads. The ground floor contains shop fronts and a cast iron verandah.	II
National Westminster Bank, 130 Lord Street; 53.64851°N 3.00393°W		1892	Designed by William Owen for Parr's Bank, it is in sandstone with a green slate roof, and is in free Renaissance style. It stands on a corner site, is in two storeys with an attic and has five bays. The front is rusticated, the outer bays project forward and have Dutch gables, each containing an oculus. Between these, at the top of the building, is a pierced parapet with urns.	II
Café on Lakeside; 53.65373°N 3.00513°W	—	1892-1913 (probable)	The café is timber-framed on a brick plinth with plaster panels and a tiled roof with pierced ridge tiles. It is in Neo-Tudor style with a cruciform plan and is in a single storey. The fronts are gabled, the east and west sides having decorative pierced bargeboards.	II
Lakeside Inn; 53.65368°N 3.00404°W		1892-1913 (probable)	A small public house, timber-framed with panelled walls, and a tiled roof with finials. It has a rectangular plan, is in two storeys (one on the front), and has a three-bay loggia on wooden posts.	II
Royal Bank of Scotland; 53.64781°N 3.00689°W	—	1893	A bank by W. W. Gwyther in French Renaissance style. Built in sandstone on a red granite plinth, it has three storeys with an attic and four bays. The right bay contains a Tuscan porch, the two storeys above have bay windows. Behind the attic window is a pavilion roof with a wrought iron corona. In the other bays are pilasters in the ground floor, Ionic columns in the first floor, and at the top is a balustraded parapet with urns.	II
Verandah, 601–617 Lord Street; 53.65147°N 3.00022°W	—	1893	A verandah by Mellor and Sutton in front of a row of shops. It is in seven bays and consists of cast iron columns supporting a glass roof.	II
179–205 Lord Street; 53.64694°N 3.00839°W	—	1895	Shops and a commercial building by E. W. Johnson in brick with sandstone dressings, in four storeys and seven bays. The ground floor contains shop fronts and has a cast iron verandah. Above are canted oriel windows in two storeys, except the middle bay which is in three storeys. The outer and central bays have Dutch gables and the others have shaped gables.	II
273–281 Lord Street; 53.64790°N 3.00670°W	—	1895	Shops in brick with sandstone dressings in Renaissance style. They are in two parts, both having two bays with shop fronts in the ground floor, and pilasters and oriel windows above. The left part is in four storeys with a verandah in the ground floor and a shaped gable; the right part is in three storeys with a parapet at the top.	II
Emmanuel Church; 53.66069°N 2.97551°W		1895–98	A church by Preston and Vaughan in Perpendicular style. It is built in brick with sandstone dressings and a slate roof. The church consists of a nave with a narthex and clerestory, aisles, a south baptistry, paired transepts, a chancel, and a tower at the crossing. The tower has gargoyles, an embattled parapet with corner turrets, and a small flèche with a cross.	II
Holy Trinity Church; 53.65023°N 2.99674°W		1895–1913	Built on the site of previous churches, it was designed by Huon Matear in free Perpendicular style. The church is built in brick with dressings of Portland stone and sandstone with slate roofs. It consists of a nave with aisles, a north transept, a chancel with a north chapel and south vestry, and a northwest tower. The tower is in four stages, the lower part being in brick and the upper part in stone with pinnacles.	II*
Wayfarer's Arcade; 53.64825°N 3.00606°W		1896–98	Designed by G. E. Bolshaw, this consists of two shops on Lord Street, with a verandah in front, and between the shops an entrance leading to an arcade of more shops. The front shops are in sandstone in three storeys and in Renaissance style. A short passage lined by shops leads to a wider, glazed balconied passage with shops on two levels, ending in an octagon, also glazed and with balconies.	II
315–325 Lord Street; 53.64836°N 3.00590°W	—	1898	Shop and offices by T. Hodge in brick with terracotta and sandstone dressings. They are in three storeys and four bays. The outer bays are taller with elaborate tops, including tourelles and onion finials. In the ground floor are shop fronts with a verandah on cast iron columns. The middle storey contains windows, with bay windows in the outer bays. In the top floor are windows with horseshoe-shaped arches in Moorish style.	II
The Old Bank; 53.64878°N 3.00515°W	—	1898	Originally a bank by Robert Todd in Neoclassical style, later a shop. It has a ground floor in granite and upper parts in sandstone. The building is in three storeys and three bays. The ground floor has an entrance with a fanlight and two round-headed windows, between which are Tuscan columns. In the upper storeys are sash windows, a cornice and a plain parapet.	II
Scarisbrick Mausoleum; 53.67324°N 2.94794°W		1899–1901	The mausoleum by E. W. Johnson for the Scarisbrick family of Scarisbrick Hall is in sandstone with slate roofs. It is in Neo-Norman style, and has a cruciform plan. The building consists of a nave and transepts with a curved apse. At the west end is a moulded round-arched doorway, there are similarly decorated windows on the sides, and round windows in the transepts. On the gables are apex crosses, and there are louvred dormers in the roof.	II
Bandstand; 53.64453°N 3.01779°W		c. 1900 (probable)	The bandstand is in Victoria Park. It is in cast iron on a concrete base with a felted roof, it has an octagonal plan and is in a single storey. There is a column at each angle. The umbrella-roof shaped roof is surmounted by an octagonal corona with a finial.	II
First shelter 53.64828°N 3.01181°W	—	c. 1900 (probable)	The shelter by the Marine Lake is in cast iron and glass with a lead roof, it has an H-shaped plan, and is in s single storey. The columns have crocketed capitals and foliated brackets, and the panels contain Art Nouveau motifs. In the shelter are slatted wooden benches.	II
Second shelter 53.64786°N 3.01253°W	—	c. 1900 (probable)	The shelter by the Marine Lake is in cast iron and glass with a lead roof, it has an H-shaped plan, and is in s single storey. The columns have crocketed capitals and foliated brackets, and the panels contain Art Nouveau motifs. In the shelter are slatted wooden benches.	II
Third shelter 53.64772°N 3.01318°W	—	c. 1900 (probable)	The shelter by the Marine Lake is in cast iron and glass with a lead roof, it has an H-shaped plan, and is in s single storey. The columns have crocketed capitals and foliated brackets, and the panels contain Art Nouveau motifs. In the shelter are slatted wooden benches.	II
Fourth shelter 53.64779°N 3.01392°W	—	c. 1900 (probable)	The shelter by the Marine Lake is in cast iron and glass with a lead roof, it has an H-shaped plan, and is in s single storey. The columns have crocketed capitals and foliated brackets, and the panels contain Art Nouveau motifs. In the shelter are slatted wooden benches.	II
Fifth shelter 53.64802°N 3.01436°W	—	c. 1900 (probable)	The shelter by the Marine Lake is in cast iron and glass with a lead roof, it has an H-shaped plan, and is in s single storey. The columns have crocketed capitals and foliated brackets, and the panels contain Art Nouveau motifs. In the shelter are slatted wooden benches.	II
Shelter by Marine Lake; 53.65023°N 3.00942°W	—	c. 1900 (probable)	The shelter by the Marine Lake is in cast iron and glass with a lead roof, it has an H-shaped plan, and is in s single storey. The columns have crocketed capitals and foliated brackets, and the panels contain Art Nouveau motifs. In the shelter are slatted wooden benches.	II
Shelter opposite Albany Road; 53.65748°N 3.00101°W	—	c. 1900 (probable)	The shelter by the Marine Lake is in cast iron and glass with a lead roof, it has an H-shaped plan, and is in s single storey. The columns have crocketed capitals and foliated brackets, and the panels contain Art Nouveau motifs. In the shelter are slatted wooden benches.	II
Shelter opposite No. 10 Promenade; 53.64784°N 3.01045°W	—	c. 1900 (probable)	The shelter on the Promenade is in cast iron and glass with a lead roof, it has an H-shaped plan, and is in s single storey. The columns have crocketed capitals and foliated brackets, and the panels contain Art Nouveau motifs. In the shelter are slatted wooden benches.	II
Shelter opposite No. 30 Promenade; 53.64918°N 3.00884°W	—	c. 1900 (probable)	The shelter on the Promenade is in cast iron and glass with a lead roof, it has an H-shaped plan, and is in s single storey. The columns have crocketed capitals and foliated brackets, and the panels contain Art Nouveau motifs. In the shelter are slatted wooden benches.	II
Shelter in King's Gardens; 53.64713°N 3.01194°W	—	c. 1900 (probable)	The shelter, moved from its original position, is in cast iron and glass with a lead roof, it has an H-shaped plan, and is in s single storey. The columns have crocketed capitals and foliated brackets, and the panels contain Art Nouveau motifs. In the shelter are slatted wooden benches.	II
The Guest House; 53.65061°N 2.99943°W		c. 1900 (probable)	This pub existed by 1910 but was probably built around 1900, when Robert Haslam was recorded as operating a beerhouse on the site on Union Street. The building has sandstone ashlar walls with timber framing above, and has elements of the Arts and Crafts style. The main entrance is flanked by pilasters with decorative carvings, and immediately above this is an intricate plaster panel with the name of the pub. Some of the windows have stained glass and leaded lights.	II
Westminster Mansions; 53.64669°N 3.00696°W	—	1900	A block of shops with chambers above on a corner site by G. E. Bolshaw in free Queen Anne style. They are in brick with terracotta dressings and a slated mansard roof, in three storeys and two attic storeys. Features include wrought iron balconies, an octagonal corner turret, canted oriel windows, Dutch gables, and a verandah carried round the fronts.	II
355 and 357 Lord Street; 53.64874°N 3.00525°W	—	c. 1901	A shop by G. S. Packer in sandstone with granite dressings in Renaissance style. It has four storeys and is in a single bay. In the ground floor is a modern shop front and a verandah on cast iron columns. The first floor has a wide oriel window with a pierced parapet and in the second floor is a full-width semicircular arched window. In the top floor are two arched windows, over which are a cornice and a plain parapet.	II
Head Post Office; 53.64870°N 3.00361°W	—	1901	By H. Jansen, the Post Office is in brick with sandstone dressings and a slate roof in free Renaissance style. It has an L-shaped plan with a front of four storeys with an attic and five bays. In the ground floor is a three-bay arcade. The second and fourth bays project forward and rise to shaped gables flanked by tourelles.	II
Verandah, 657–671 Lord Street; 53.65206°N 2.99914°W	—	1901	A verandah by T. Hodge in front of a row of shops on a corner site. It extends for nine bays along Lord Street and one bay round the corner. The verandah consists of cast iron columns supporting a glass roof.	II
215–219 Lord Street; 53.64713°N 3.00804°W	—	1903	Shops by James E Sanders with timber-framed cladding and a slate roof in three storeys with an attic and two unequal bays. In the ground floor are shop fronts and a verandah with elaborate cresting. The first and second floors have oriel windows of different sizes, and in the attic are a balcony and windows with gables above.	II
Queen Victoria Monument; 53.65024°N 3.00709°W		1903	The monument is by George Frampton and consists of a bronze statue depicting Queen Victoria standing and holding the orb and sceptre. The statue stands on a high white granite plinth.	II
509–515 Lord Street; 53.65023°N 3.00251°W		1905 (probable)	Shops by Kiddle and Company in sandstone with a slated mansard roof on a corner site. They are in three storeys with attics and have four bays on each front. In the ground floor are shop fronts and a canopy. Above, the bays are divided by giant pilasters between which are windows. At the top is a full entablature with a dentilled cornice, and in the attic are pedimented dormers.	II
St Mark's Church; 53.64740°N 2.99553°W		c. 1905	A Methodist church by F. W. Dixon in Arts and Crafts Perpendicular style, later used as a medical centre. It is in brick with sandstone dressings and green slate roofs. The church consists of a nave, transepts, a chancel, and a tower. The tower has a shaped parapet and a small spire.	II
15 Rutland Road; 53.63722°N 2.98890°W	—	1906	A house by S. D. Pennington in Arts and Crafts style. It is in brick, partly rendered, with some applied timber-framing, and a tiled roof. The house is in two storeys and three bays. The left bay projects forward and is gabled, the right bay is recessed and contains a porch. The central bay has a casement window and a bull's eye window in the ground floor, an oriel window in the upper floor, and a gable.	II
28 Cambridge Road; 53.65912°N 2.97904°W	—	1907	A detached house by John Hughes, rendered on brick, with a tiled roof in Art Nouveau style. It is in two storeys with an attic and has an asymmetrical three-part front, partly gabled. Features include a flat-topped dormer, a two-storey bow window, a bay window, and a segmental-headed window in the gable.	II
Ainsdale War Memorial; 53.60148°N 3.03374°W		1920	The memorial is made from Stoke Hall stone, and consists of a Celtic cross on a tapering shaft containing interlace decoration. The shaft rises from a tapering plinth on a base of three steps. On the plinth is an inscription and names of those lost in the First World War. There are further inscriptions and names on the steps. The memorial stands in a paved enclosure surrounded by drystone walls with stone pillars and a gate.	II
National Westminster Bank, 253 Lord Street; 53.64770°N 3.00705°W		1922	A bank by Francis Jones in Portland stone in Neoclassical style. It has a portico with large fluted Ionic columns on plinths, between which are steps leading up to a doorway with a decorated architrave including a cornice on consoles, and bronze doors. At the top is a full entablature and a modillioned pediment.	II
Southport War Memorial; 53.64865°N 3.00436°W		1923	The war memorial was designed by Grayson and Barnish, and carved by Herbert Tyson Smith. It consists of an obelisk in a roundabout, on either sides of this are colonnades, and beyond these are gardens. The obelisk and colonnades are in Portland stone.	II*
Boathouse; 53.65371°N 3.00448°W	—	Early 20th century (probable)	The boathouse is at right-angles to the Promenade. It is a single-storey rectangular structure in brick with an asphalt roof which forms a viewing platform. This is surrounded by a cast iron balustrade.	II
Verandah, 459–467 Lord Street; 53.64976°N 3.00328°W	—	Early 20th century (probable)	A verandah in front of a row of shops. It has five bays and consists of five cast iron columns carrying a glass roof.	II
Verandah, 487–495 Lord Street; 53.65000°N 3.00283°W	—	Early 20th century (probable)	A verandah in front of a row of shops. It has six bays and consists of six cast iron columns carrying a glass roof.	II
Verandah, 497–507 Lord Street; 53.65012°N 3.00263°W	—	Early 20th century (probable)	A verandah in front of a row of shops. It has six bays and consists of six cast iron columns carrying a glass roof.	II
Verandah, 517–523 Lord Street; 53.65039°N 3.00215°W		Early 20th century (probable)	A verandah in front of a row of shops. It has six bays on Lord Street and three on Bold Street. It consists of cast iron columns carrying a glass roof.	II
Verandah, 525–533 Lord Street; 53.65050°N 3.00196°W	—	Early 20th century (probable)	A verandah in front of a row of shops. It has four bays and consists of cast iron columns carrying a glass roof.	II
Verandah, 565–571 Lord Street; 53.65084°N 3.00135°W	—	Early 20th century (probable)	A verandah in front of a row of shops. It has four bays and consists of cast iron columns carrying a glass roof.	II
367 Lord Street; 53.64886°N 3.00498°W		1925–27	Later a shop, originally the National and Provincial Bank by Palmer and Holden, in Neoclassical style, and built in Portland stone. It has 2 1/2 storeys and an attic, and a symmetrical three-bay front. The ground floor is rusticated with a central pedimented entrance and windows in round-headed arches. The upper two floors have fluted Roman Doric columns, windows and a full entablature with triglyphs and a pediment containing an oculus.	II
Horsfield; 53.65471°N 2.97588°W	—	1928	A house by G. Henderson in roughcast on brick with a green slate roof, in Arts and Crafts style. It has 1 1/2 storeys and two bays, with an outshut on the left. In the roof are two two-light dormers, and a window in the left gable contains Art Nouveau glazing.	II
Garrick Theatre; 53.64532°N 3.01163°W		1932	A theatre by George Tonge in Art Deco style, later used as a bingo hall. It stands on a corner site, and is in brick with dressings in Portland stone and concrete. The building consists of two taller blocks connected by a two-storey range containing five windows and an open five-bay colonnade. In the ground floor are shop fronts with a canopy. The windows are tall, some with tapered tops, and some decorated with bands of chevrons.	II
Telephone kiosk 53.64867°N 3.00375°W	—	1935	A K6 type telephone kiosk outside the Head Post Office. It was designed by Giles Gilbert Scott, and is constructed in cast iron with a square plan and a dome. The kiosk has three unperforated crowns in the top panels.	II
Telephone kiosks 53.64772°N 3.00552°W	—	1935	A pair of K6 type telephone kiosks outside Christ Church. They were designed by Giles Gilbert Scott, and are constructed in cast iron with a square plan and a dome. The kiosks have three unperforated crowns in the top panels.	II
Telephone kiosks 53.65129°N 3.00034°W	—	1935	A pair of K6 type telephone kiosks outside North Post Office. They were designed by Giles Gilbert Scott, and are constructed in cast iron with a square plan and a dome. The kiosks have three unperforated crowns in the top panels.	II
Grand Cinema; 53.65108°N 2.99952°W	—	1938	The cinema was converted from a car showroom by George Tonge, and later used as a casino. The façade is in faience and the other walls are brick. Inside is a foyer and an auditorium with a small stage. The symmetrical front is in two storeys and seven bays with entrances in the three central bays under a canopy. In the upper floor are windows. There is a continuous entablature with the parapet rising over the central bays.	II
