= Southport War Memorial =

Listed war memorial in Merseyside, England

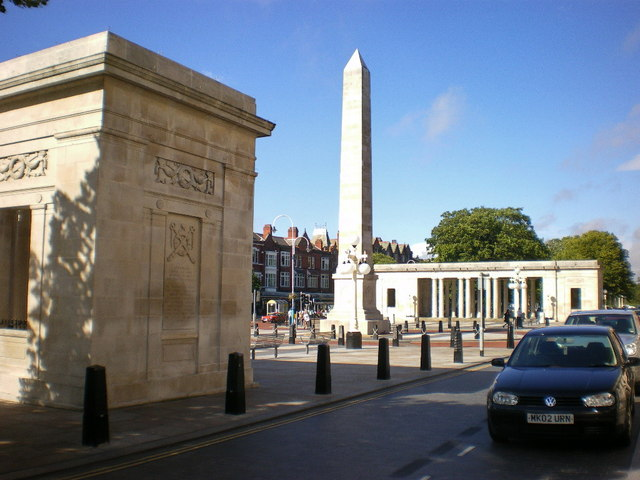
- Southport War Memorial, showing the obelisk and colonnades

- Location within Merseyside

General information
- Location: Lord Street, Southport, Merseyside, England
- Coordinates: 53.6487°N 3.0044°W
- Opened: 1923

Design and construction
- Architects: Grayson and Barnish (designer); Herbert Tyson Smith (sculptor)
- Designations

Listed Building – Grade II*
- Official name: War memorial obelisk, north-east colonnade, south-west colonnade, pools of remembrance and memorial garden walls, and cast-iron lamp standards
- Designated: 15 November 1972
- Reference no.: 1379604

Southport War Memorial is in London Square, Lord Street, Southport, Merseyside, England. It consists of an obelisk flanked by two colonnades in the form of Greek temples. Outside the colonnades are memorial gardens, each containing a Pool of Remembrance and fountains. The memorial was designed by the local architects Grayson and Barnish, and the carving was executed by Herbert Tyson Smith. It was unveiled in 1923 by the Earl of Derby. Following the Second World War and subsequent conflicts further inscriptions and names have been added. The memorial is recorded in the National Heritage List for England as a designated Grade II* listed building.

== History ==
As a result of a meeting on 14 February 1919, a War Memorial Committee was established to raise money by public subscription for a monument, to extend the hospital, and to provide grants for bereaved children. The monument was to be sited in London Square as part of a scheme to remodel the centre of the town. A total of £31,854 was raised, and a competition was launched for the design of the monument. Reginald Blomfield was appointed as adviser and assessor of the competition. (Note: Blomfield had designed the Menin Gate and the Cross of Sacrifice in Ypres.) The first prize was given to the Liverpool partnership of Grayson and Barnish. (Note: The partnership comprised George Hastwell Grayson and Leonard Barnish. Morris and Roberts argue that it is most likely that the designer was Barnish.)

The original designs did not specifically include any sculpture, and concern was expressed about this, leading to the appointment of Herbert Tyson Smith as sculptor. The initial tenders for building the memorial were considered to be too high, and after a second set of tenders W. Moss and Son were commissioned as main contractors. Following some delays in its construction, the memorial was unveiled on 18 November 1923 by the Earl of Derby. Following the Second World War, an additional inscription was designed by Barnish and executed by Tyson Smith; this was unveiled on 28 October 1956. At the same time fountains were installed in the Pools of Remembrance. In 1992 plaques were added containing the names of those lost in the Second World War, and later the names of those who have died as a result of later conflicts have been added.

== Description ==
The memorial consists of an obelisk, two colonnades, and gardens. The colonnades and obelisk are constructed in Portland stone, the sculpture and lettered panels are in Meuriel marble, and the Second World War inscription is in Hopton Wood Stone. The obelisk stands in the centre of a traffic island, with the colonnades to the northeast and southwest, and the gardens beyond them.

=== Obelisk ===
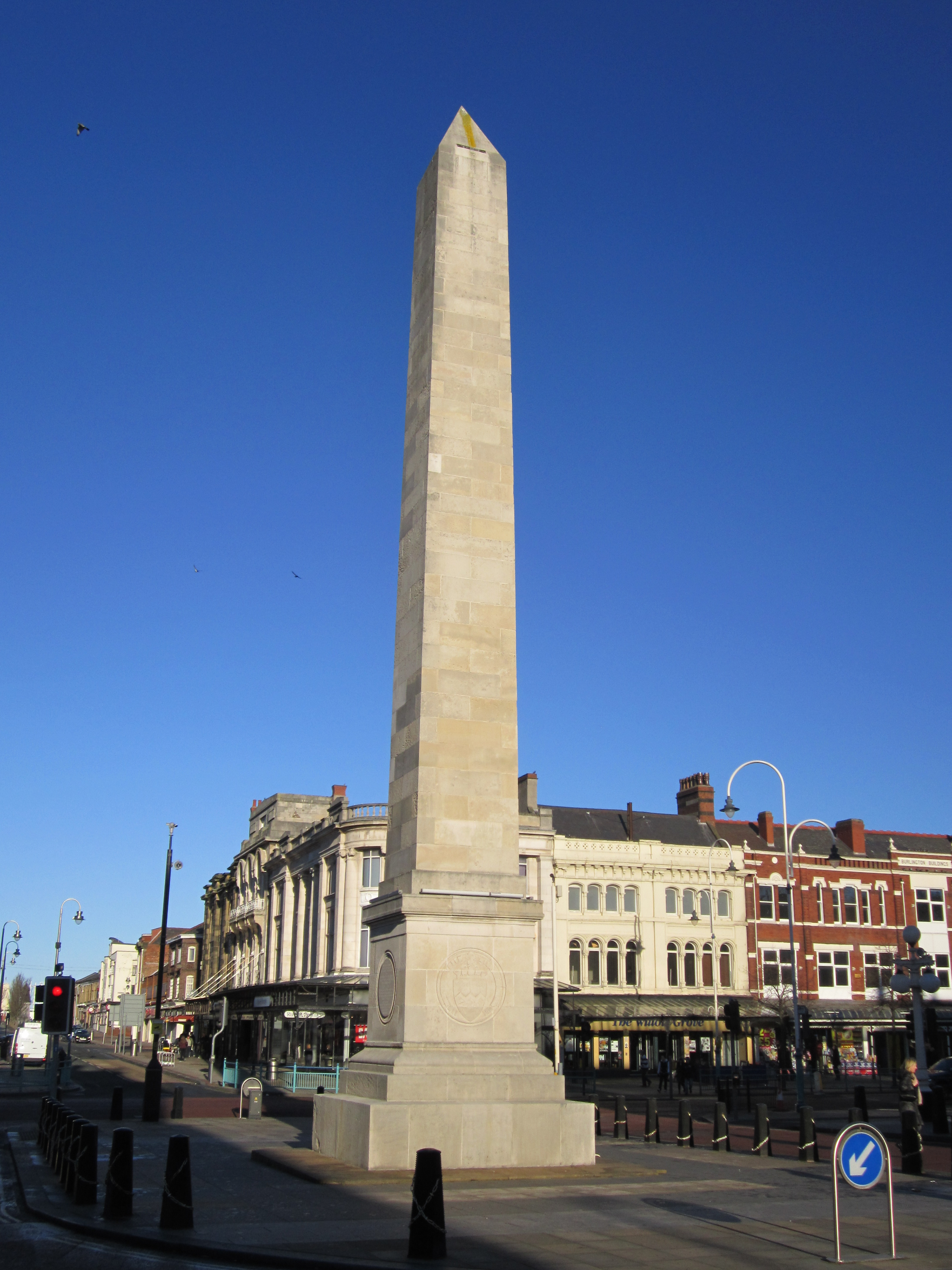
Obelisk

The obelisk is 67 feet 6 inches (20.6 m) tall and stands on a square pedestal and base. There are carved roundels on three faces of the obelisk. That on the northwest face contains a wreath and the inscription:

LOOK UPWARD STANDING MUTE. SALUTE (Note: These are the last two lines of an Armistice Day poem entitled The Army of the Dead by Barry Pain.)

On the base below this are inscribed the dates "MCMXIV–MCMXVIII". The northeast face is plain. On the southeast face are the coat of arms of Southport and the inscription:

SALUS POPULI (Note: Which translates as "the welfare of the people".)

The roundel on the southwest face was added in 1956. It was designed by Barnish, carved by Tyson Smith, and contains the following inscription:

TO THE MEN AND WOMEN OF THIS COUNTY BOROUGH WHO GAVE THEIR LIVES FOR THE LIBERTY OF THE WORLD AND THE SECURITY OF THIS REALM IN THE WORLD WAR 1939–1945
THEIR NAMES ARE RECORDED IN THE BOOK OF REMEMBRANCE WHICH LIES NEARBY IN THE KEEPING OF CHRIST CHURCH
THE FOUNTAINS ADDED TO THE MEMORIAL POOLS ARE DEDICATED TO THEIR HONOURED MEMORY

=== Colonnades ===
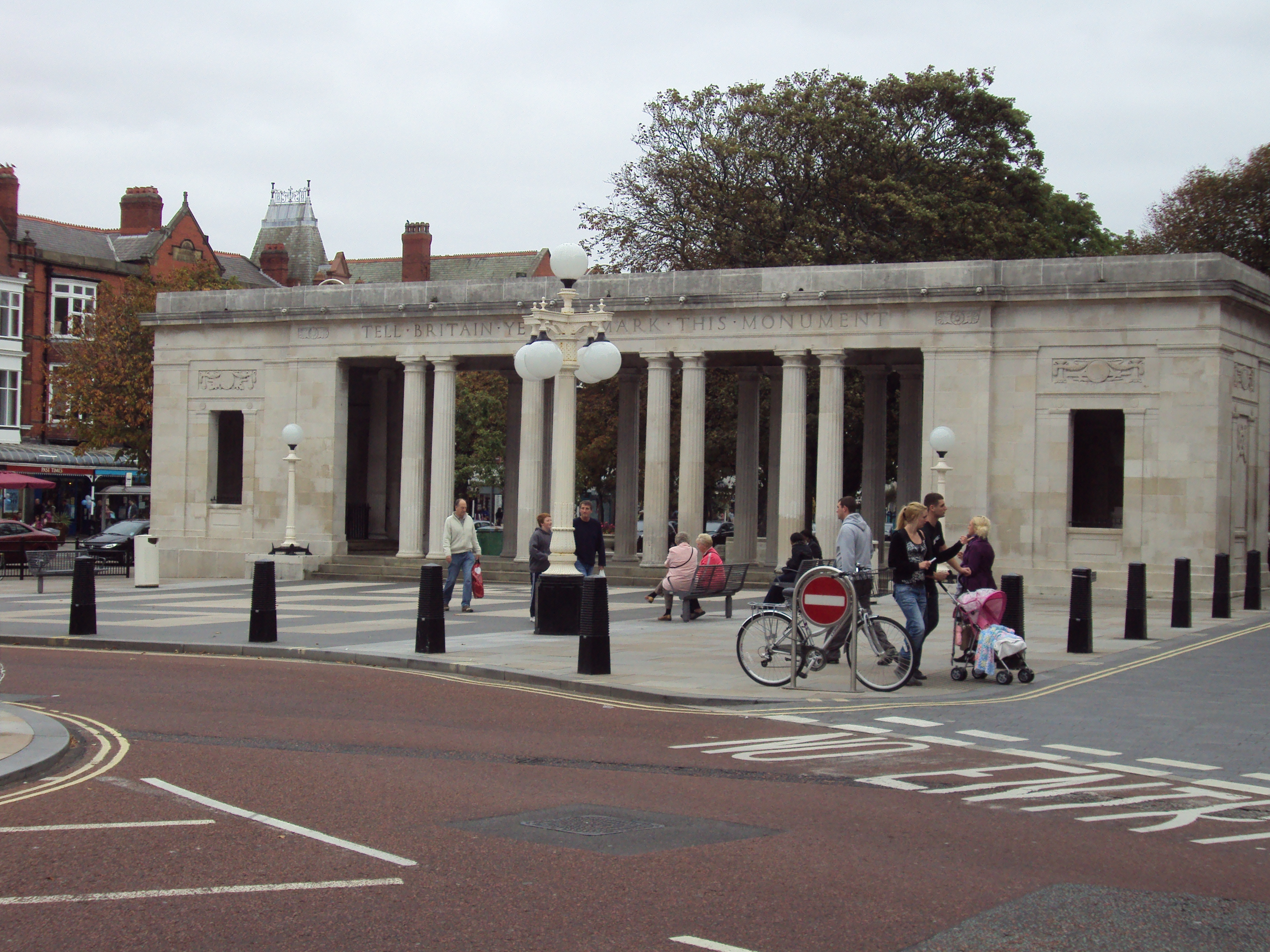
Northeast colonnade

The colonnades are similar to each other, but have different carvings, inscriptions and contents. They are in the style of Greek temples, symmetrical with a rectangular plan, are in a single storey, and have flat roofs. On each side there are four pairs of fluted Doric columns forming an open colonnade of five bays. At each end is an enclosed cenotaph with an entablature containing inscriptions, and with two open windows above which are carved panels. There are also carved panels and inscriptions on the ends of the colonnades. At the entrances to the cenotaphs are fluted Ionic columns, and inside the ceilings are coffered. At the centre of each cenotaph is a pedestal altar, and on the walls are marble tablets containing the names of the engagements in the First World War, regimental badges, and the names of the dead and their rank arranged by regiment and unit. The names are of those who were lost in both World Wars and in later conflicts. Adjacent to the colonnades, and surrounding the obelisk, are cast iron lamp stands that were cast by the Bromsgrove Guild. They have fluted columns, and their bases are decorated with acanthus leaves.

==== Northeast colonnade ====
The entablature on the side facing the obelisk is inscribed with:

TELL BRITAIN YE WHO MARK THIS MONUMENT (Note: Tell Britain ye who mark this monument Faithful to her we fell and rest content This is an adaptation of the epitaph on the Wagon Hill Cemetery Monument which commemorates troopers of the Imperial Light Horse who died in the Boer War, and was itself an adaptation of the Epitaph of Simonides on the Spartans who fell at Thermopylae.)

and on the side facing the garden is:

THEIR PORTION IS WITH THE ETERNAL (Note: By the poet Laurence Binyon)

On the northwest face of the colonnade is a panel carved with a depiction of Britannia holding a statuette of Victory. Facing the garden is a platform with the following inscription:

THEY DIED THAT WE MIGHT LIVE
WE LIVE ONLY AS WE SAFEGUARD
THE IDEALS FOR WHICH THEY DIED
FREEDOM JUSTICE MERCY
SO LET US LIVE
THAT WE MAY SHARE WITH THEM THE LIFE ETERNAL (Note: By Frederick Riley)

The altar in the northwest cenotaph is carved with representations of Patroclus and Achilles. On the wall is a tablet inscribed with:

FOR THE SACRED CAUSE OF JUSTICE (Note: This taken from the Tomb of the Unknown Warrior.)

==== Southwest colonnade ====
On the side of the entablature facing the obelisk is the inscription:

FAITHFUL TO HER WE FELL AND REST CONTENT

and on the side facing the garden is:

TO FAMOUS MEN ALL EARTH IS SEPULCHRE (Note: This is a translation of a phrase by Thucydides in his History of the Peloponnesian War.)

The panel on the northwest side of the colonnade depicts Britannia offering a tribute to the dead and represents "Mourning". On the northeast side is a panel inscribed:

REMEMBER THAT THE MEN WHOSE NAMES LIVE ON THESE WALLS DIED IN YOUTH OR PRIME
THAT FUTURE GENERATIONS MIGHT INHERIT A HAPPIER WORLD
AND A HUMAN SOCIETY MORE RIGHTEOUS AND MORE LOVING THAN THOSE BRAVE MEN AND THEIR GENERATION KNEW (Note: This is an adaptation of the inscription on the US Army memorial to American soldiers who fell in France.)

The altar in the southwest cenotaph is carved with a representation of "Death and the Soldier". There are two inscribed tablets. One reads:

ALL THAT THEY HAD THEY GAVE (Note: This is taken from The King's Pilgrimage by Rudyard Kipling.)

and the other is inscribed with:

THEIR NAME LIVETH (Note: From Ecclesiasticus chapter 44, verse 14.)

=== Gardens ===
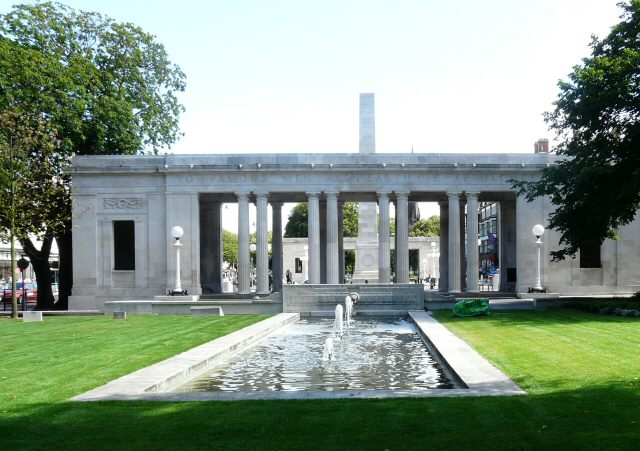
Southwest Memorial Garden with Pool of Remembrance and fountains

Outside each colonnade is a Memorial Garden. In the centre of each is a long rectangular Pool of Remembrance containing three fountains. The pool is surrounded by flat copings in Portland stone, and at the colonnade end of the pool is a low curved parapet with a spout in the form of a lion's head. The pool is flanked by lawns, outside which is balustrading in Portland stone.

== Appraisal ==
The war memorial was designated as a listed building on 15 November 1972, and was graded at II* on 5 March 2010. Grade II* listing is granted to "particularly important buildings of more than special interest". In the reasons given for listing at this grade it is stated that the memorial forms "a highly striking, powerful and reverential war memorial assemblage" and it provides "a sense of dignity and atmosphere within the town centre". Its classical styling, the colonnades in the form of Greek temples, and the carvings and inscriptions "draw comparison to battles in ancient Greece and slain warriors".

== See also ==
- Grade II* listed buildings in Merseyside
- Grade II* listed war memorials in England
- Listed buildings in Southport

== Notes and references ==
Notes

Citations

Sources

- Morris, Edward; Roberts, Emma (2012), Public Sculpture of Cheshire and Merseyside (excluding Liverpool), Public Sculpture of Britain, vol. 15, Liverpool: Liverpool University Press, ISBN 978-1-84631-492-6
- Historic England, "War memorial obelisk, north-east colonnade, south-west colonnade, pools of remembrance and memorial garden walls, and cast-iron lamp standards, Southport (1379604)", National Heritage List for England
- Historic England, Listed Buildings
- Vandiver, Elizabeth (2010), Stand in the Trench, Achilles: Classical Receptions in British Poetry of the Great War Classical Presences, Oxford University Press, p. lxii, 27, ISBN 9780191609213
