= Southport Town Hall =

Municipal building in Southport, Merseyside, England

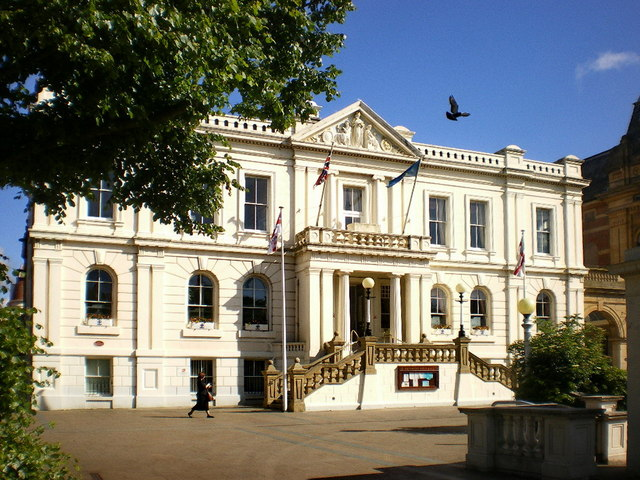
- Southport Town Hall

- Location in Southport town centre
- 53.6475°N 3.0056°W
- Location: Lord Street, Southport, Sefton, Merseyside, England
- OS grid reference: SD 336 173

History
- Built: 1852–53
- Built for: Southport Corporation

Site notes
- Architect: Thomas Withnell
- Architectural style: Palladian
- Governing body: Sefton Metropolitan Borough Council

Listed Building – Grade II
- Designated: 15 November 1972
- Reference no.: 1379678

Southport Town Hall is on the east side of Lord Street, Southport, Sefton, Merseyside, England. It was built in 1852–53 in Palladian style, and extended to the rear on three occasions later in the century. The town hall has a symmetrical stuccoed façade with a central staircase leading up to a porch flanked by columns. At the top of the building is a pediment with a carved tympanum. The town hall is recorded in the National Heritage List for England as a designated Grade II listed building.

== History ==
The town hall was designed by Thomas Withnell and built at a cost of about £4,500 between 1852 and 1853. The building was extended to the rear in 1859, and was further extended in 1865, and again later in the 19th century.

In 1964 the architect, John Poulson, put forward a plan, which was never realised, to demolish the town hall and various other properties to create a shopping centre.

The town hall was the headquarters of the county borough of Southport but ceased to be the local seat of government when the Metropolitan Borough of Sefton was formed in 1974. The main administrative base for new council was established at Bootle Town Hall although the council continued to maintain a presence in Southport by holding some of the meetings of its full council at Southport Town Hall.

In 2012 a blue plaque was erected outside the town hall to recognise the sacrifice of F. J. Hooper, a local man who went to the South Pole in search of the bodies of Robert Falcon Scott and his team after their ill-fated Terra Nova Expedition in 1912.

== Architecture ==
Southport Town Hall has a stuccoed façade painted white, and a slate roof in Palladian style. It has a rectangular plan plus extensions to the rear. The hall is in two storeys with a basement, and it has a symmetrical front of seven bays. Between some of the bays are paired pilasters, giving a window arrangement of 1:2:1:2:1. The basement and ground floor are rusticated. Between the floors are a frieze and a cornice, the upper cornice being dentillated. In the centre of the building is a double parallel staircase with a balustraded parapet. This leads to a porch flanked by a pair of pilasters and a fluted Doric column on each side. On top of the porch is a triglyph frieze, a cornice, and a balustraded parapet. Above the porch is a balcony with a window flanked by Ionic semi-columns and paired pilasters. The windows in the basement are short and rectangular, those in the ground floor are tall and round-headed with keystones and voussoirs, and in the upper floor they are tall and flat-headed with architraves. All the windows contain sashes. Above the central bay is a pediment with a tympanum containing carved personifications of Justice, Mercy and Truth, and this is flanked by balustraded parapets. The original interiors are no longer present.

== Appraisal ==
The town hall was designated as a Grade II listed building on 15 November 1972. Grade II is the lowest of the three grades of listing and is applied to buildings that are "nationally important and of special interest". The authors of the Buildings of England series comment that the design is "quite modest ... but impressive". The town hall forms a group with other Grade II listed buildings nearby, the Atkinson Art Gallery and Library, and the Southport Arts Centre.

== See also ==
- Listed buildings in Southport
