= Maxwell and Tuke =

British architectural firm

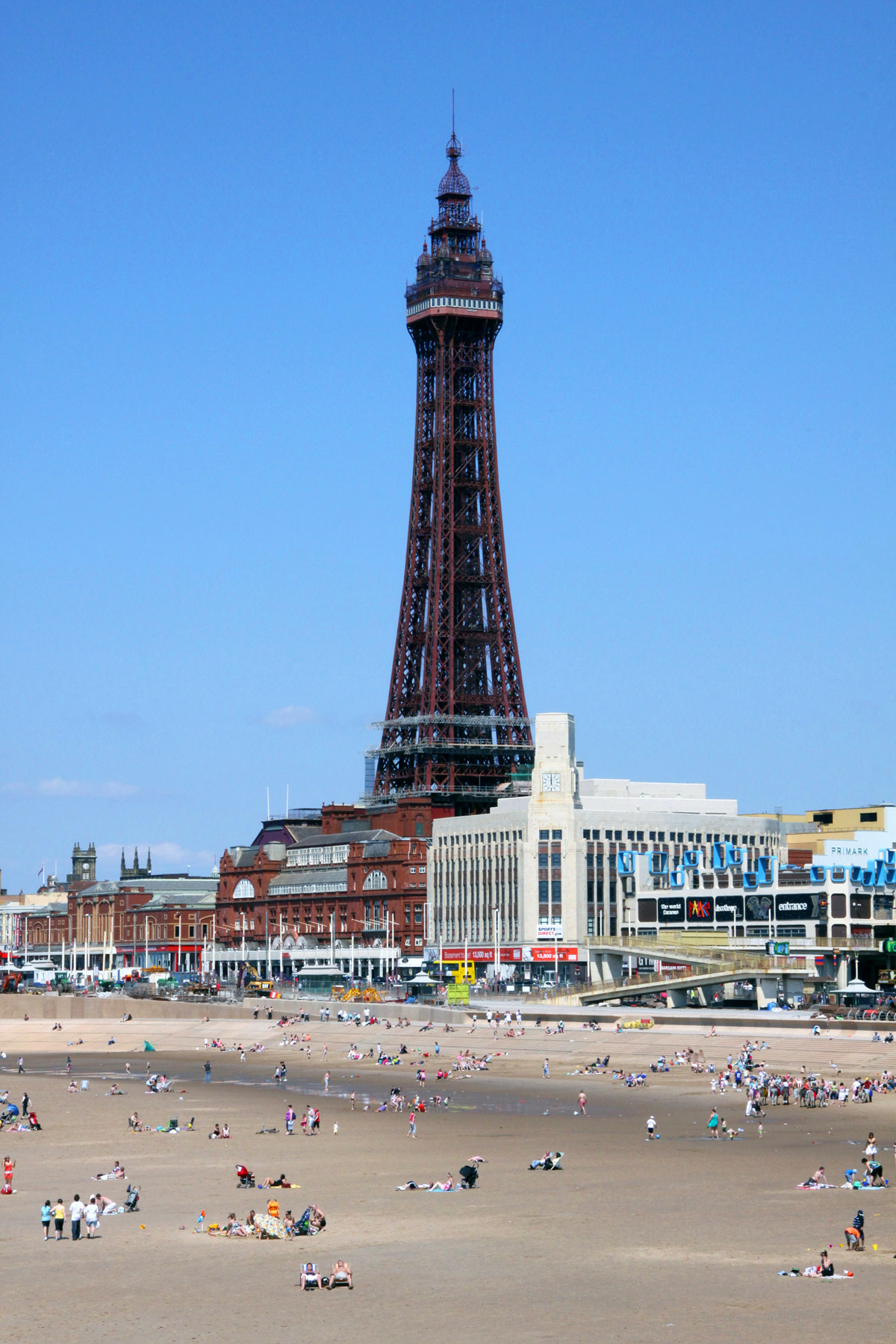
Blackpool Tower 1891–94, the most notable extant work by the practice

Maxwell and Tuke was an architectural practice in Northwest England, founded in 1857 by James Maxwell in Bury. In 1865 Maxwell was joined in the practice by Charles Tuke, who became a partner two years later. The practice moved its main office to Manchester in 1884. Frank, son of James Maxwell, joined the practice in the later 1880s and became a partner. The two senior partners both died in 1893, and Frank Maxwell continued the practice, maintaining its name as Maxwell and Tuke.

In the early years the practice designed relatively small buildings in and around Bury. Their first major commission came in 1871 for Cambridge Hall, Southport. Later works included the Ulster Reform Club in Belfast, and extensive temporary structures to house the Royal Jubilee Exhibition in Manchester in 1887/1888. After this they had their most notable commission, the design of Blackpool Tower. (Note: Taking three years for construction it used 2,500 tons of steel and five million Accrington bricks." The design was a forerunner for its time. As a writer for the BBC noted: "In heavy winds the building will gently sway, what a magnificent Victorian engineering masterpiece.") Both senior partners died before this could be completed, and the work was continued by Frank Maxwell. The commercial success of Blackpool Tower led to a commission to design the even larger New Brighton Tower. (Note: Which eclipsed the Blackpool Tower and succeeded to the title of tallest building in Great Britain when it opened some time between 1898 and 1900. It was later demolished, following a serious fire in 1969.) The practice continued to design notable buildings into the 20th century.

== Partners ==
=== James Maxwell (1838–93) ===
James Maxwell was born on 14 June 1838 in Haslingden, Lancashire. His father, Thomas, was a builder, plumber and glazier. James was educated at the grammar school in Whalley, and was then articled to Thomas Holmes, an architect in Bury, which was then in Lancashire and later in Greater Manchester. Maxwell established his own architectural practice in Bury in December 1857. On 28 September 1893 he died at his home in Bury from cerebritis.

=== William Charles Tuke (1843–93) ===
William Charles Tuke, usually known as Charles Tuke, was born on 12 January 1843 in the village of Bolton in the parish of Calverley near Bradford, West Yorkshire. His father, William, was a land agent, architect, and surveyor. He first trained as an articled clerk in his father's practice, moved briefly to Chester, worked as an architect's assistant in Wolverhampton, and then undertook the same role in the practice of Mills and Murgatroyd in Manchester. Tuke joined Maxwell in 1865 and became his partner in 1867. Tuke later lived at The Hydro, St Annes on Sea, Lancashire, where he died on 28 March 1893 from nephritis.

=== Francis William Maxwell (1863–1941) ===
Francis William Maxwell, usually known as Frank, was the second son of James Maxwell, and was born in Bury on 7 December 1863. He was educated at the Friend's School in Kendal and then at Owen's College, Manchester. In the late 1880s he joined his father's practice, and was made a partner. He died on 13 August 1941 in the General Hospital, Altrincham, Cheshire.

== Practice and notable works ==
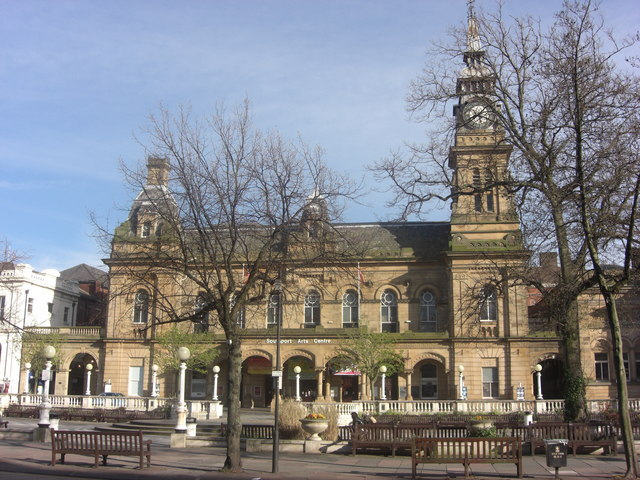
Cambridge Hall, Southport (later Southport Arts Centre) (1873–74), the earliest major commission

The earlier works of the practice were in and around Bury, and consisted of small shops and schools, and larger churches and chapels. Their first major contract resulted from winning the competition in 1871 for the design of Cambridge Hall (1873–74) in Southport, Lancashire. This commission led to the firm being appointed as architects to the Southport Pavilion and Winters Garden Company, for whom they designed the Southport Winter Gardens (1874), the first such building for the seaside leisure market. James Maxwell became director of the St Annes on Sea Land and Building Company and the partnership became its architects and agents. They worked with the Clifton family of Lytham Hall in designing the layout of the resort, and in designing houses, hotels, and the promenade in 1874–77. The practice continued to undertake local commissions, and they also took part in competitions for larger works. In 1883 they won the competition for the design of the Ulster Reform Club in Belfast (1883–85), and came second in the competition for Belfast Central Library.

In 1884 the firm moved its main office from Bury to 29 Princess Street, Manchester, and in 1887 were invited to submit plans for temporary buildings to celebrate the Royal Jubilee Exhibition. This resulted in a series of large interconnected greenhouses with a central dome over 140 feet (43 m) high. Following the erection of the Eiffel Tower, the Blackpool Tower Company was formed with the intention of building a similar structure in Blackpool, Lancashire. Maxwell and Tuke prepared detailed plans, and the construction of Blackpool Tower began in the summer of 1891. When completed, Blackpool Tower was Britain's tallest building, and second in the world to the Eiffel Tower. (Note: Of course, as technology progressed and building sizes have increased, neither of them makes the current list. See List of tallest buildings in the world.) During construction of the tower the practice was also involved in other works, including the Marine Drive (1892–93) on the Isle of Man that included a tramway and involved the building of viaducts.

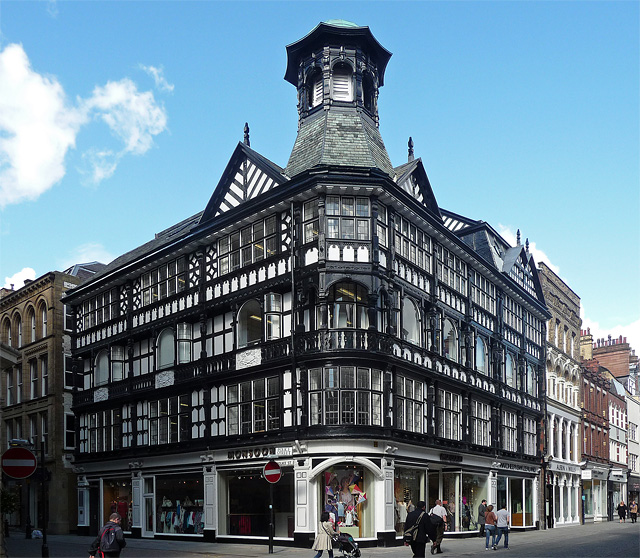
15–17 King Street, Manchester (1902), a late work

In 1893, and before the completion of Blackpool Tower the following year, both senior partners died. (Note: Tuke died on the date the flagpole was placed atop the Blackpool Tower.) The practice was then continued by Frank Maxwell as sole principal with the help of some of his assistants, and he continued to use the title of Maxwell and Tuke. Following the commercial success of Blackpool Tower, the seaside resort of New Brighton, then in Cheshire and later in Merseyside, decided to build its own tower and the New Brighton Tower and Recreation Company commissioned Maxwell and Tuke to design New Brighton Tower (1897–88). This was taller than Blackpool Tower and included an octagonal building at its base with the largest theatre in Britain outside London, and a large octagonal ballroom. Later notable commissions for the practice included Goodall's (1902), a half-timbered store in King Street, Manchester, a pavilion and entrance kiosks for the North Pier, Blackpool (1903), the dome of Rhyl Pavilion (1908, demolished), and the Whitehead Clock Tower (1914) in Bury.

== Recent history and present day ==
To 2014, more than 30 of their buildings persist, ten of which are recorded in the National Heritage List for England as designated listed buildings. Some of their buildings have been demolished, and others have been converted for other uses than their original intention. The most notable demolition is that of New Brighton Tower. Its condition was allowed to deteriorate during the First World War, and the tower itself was demolished in 1919–21. The buildings at its base continued in use until 1969 when they were severely damaged in a fire, and subsequently demolished. St Stephen's Church (1868) in Haslingden, Lancashire, has been moved to a new site and adapted for retail use. The Cooperative shop and attached hall (1973) in Eagley, Bolton, Greater Manchester, has been converted into residential use and is known as Eagley Hall. The pavilion and entrance kiosks at the North Pier, Blackpool, Lancashire, (1903) have been rebuilt and altered, and Rhyl Pavilion (1908) was demolished in 1974.

== See also ==
- List of works by Maxwell and Tuke
