= List of works by Maxwell and Tuke =

Maxwell and Tuke was an architectural practice in North West England. It was founded in 1857 and continued to design works, mainly in the local area into the 20th century. The partners were James Maxwell (1838–93), William Charles Tuke (1843–93), and Francis William Maxwell, James' second son (usually known as Frank) (1863–1941). The practice originated in Bury (then in Lancashire, later in Greater Manchester) and moved its main office to Manchester in 1884. The early designs by the practice were for relatively small buildings, such as shops and houses, and for larger ones such as churches. In 1871 they won a competition for the design of Cambridge Hall, Southport. More commissions followed, the most notable being for two large seaside towers: Blackpool Tower, followed by the larger New Brighton Tower, which has since been demolished.

Their work extended to Ireland. They won the competition to design the Reform Club, Royal Avenue, Belfast, 1883–85. The firm was placed second in the competition for the Belfast Central Library.

== Key ==
Grade	Criteria
I	Buildings of exceptional interest, sometimes considered to be internationally important
II*	Particularly important buildings of more than special interest
II	Buildings of national importance and special interest
B1	Special buildings of more local importance or good examples of some period of style (Northern Ireland)
U	Not listed

== Notable works ==
Name	Location	Photograph	Date	Notes	Grade
Stubbins Congregational Church and Sunday School	Stubbins, Lancashire	—	c. 1862	The church has been demolished. The former Sunday school has a steep gabled roof and windows with double-pointed arches.	U
Public Hall	Haslingden, Lancashire; 53.70708°N 2.32610°W		1868	The public hall is in free Italianate style, and has a symmetrical front. The building has been much altered, and was closed in December 2002.	U
St Stephen's Church	Haslingden, Lancashire; 53.69901°N 2.34383°W		1868	The former church was moved to a new site in the town in 1927, and it has been subdivided into shops. It has a northwest tower with a broach spire, and a polygonal apse. The windows contain plate tracery, and the former nave has a hammerbeam roof.	U
Eagley Hall	Eagley, Bolton, Greater Manchester; 53.61406°N 2.42546°W	—	1873	Originating as a Cooperative store and hall, it has been converted into residential use.	U
Cambridge Hall	Southport, Merseyside; 53.64717°N 3.00602°W		1873–74	The assembly hall is in French Renaissance style and built in sandstone with a slate roof. It is in two storeys with an attic. On the right side of the front is a tall clock tower, on the left is a smaller tower, and in the centre is a ventilation tower. On the ground floor is a porte-cochère and an arcade forming a loggia. The building later became known the Southport Arts Centre, and was incorporated in the arts complex, The Atkinson.	II
The Drive Methodist school-chapel	St Annes on Sea, Lancashire; 53.74851°N 3.03016°W		1877	The original building on the site, it is in red brick with yellow brick decoration on a stone plinth. It is in five bays with buttresses, and has round-arched windows. The school-chapel is part of the listing that includes the adjacent church and reading room that were built later and designed by different architects.	II
Masonic Hall and Sunday school	Southport, Merseyside; 53.64357°N 3.01143°W		1878–79	This was originally a Free Methodist Church. It is in Italianate style and was extended in 1900. The building is in sandstone with a slate roof. The entrance front contains a portico on columns, above which is an arcade of five round-headed windows, and a pediment flanked by a pierced parapet. The attached single-storey former Sunday school at the rear is included in the listing.	II
Chapels, Whitworth Cemetery	Whitworth, Lancashire; 53.66724°N 2.16524°W		1878–79	Three chapels in Gothic Revival style stand on a plateau in the centre of the cemetery. They are in sandstone with slate roofs. The central chapel has a pinnacled steeple and an apse. The flanking chapels are mirror images of each other, similar to the central chapel, but without a steeple or apse. Each of the chapels is listed.	II
Barclays Bank	Whitefield, Greater Manchester; 53.55180°N 2.29642°W		1880–83	The former bank is a tall building in red brick and terracotta. No longer a bank, it has been converted into an Italian restaurant.	U
Congregational Church	Northwich, Cheshire; 53.25745°N 2.52092°W		1882	The church is in brick. Most of its windows are lancets, and some of them contain plate tracery. The building later became a United Reformed Church but closed in 2004.	U
Christ Church	Walmersley, Bury, Greater Manchester; 53.61938°N 2.29632°W		1883	The southwest tower was added in 1913. Other features include transepts, a long chancel with a mosaic floor, and wide lancet windows.	U
Ulster Reform Club	Belfast, Northern Ireland; 54.59984°N 5.93079°W		1883–85	The commission for building the club was won in 1883. It is built mainly in brick, is in three storeys, has an arcaded ground floor and a turret on the corner.	B1
Congregational Church	Bury, Greater Manchester		1885	The church was built in red brick with yellow stone dressings. It has Gothic detailing. On the entrance front were two large four-light windows flanked by staircase turrets. The church later became a United Reformed Church but has since been demolished.	U
Former Liberal Club	Accrington, Lancashire; 53.75280°N 2.36795°W		1885	The building has been converted into flats. It is in free Renaissance style, with a symmetrical front. In the centre is a doorway approached by steps, with columns and pilasters. This is flanked by two-storey bay windows, and at the top of the building is a central pedimented dormer and a balustraded parapet.	U
Royal Jubilee Exhibition	Manchester		1887	Temporary buildings for the exhibition to celebrate the Golden Jubilee of Queen Victoria. They consisted of large interconnected greenhouses with a central dome over 140 feet (43 m) high.	—
St Mary's Church	Hawkshaw, Greater Manchester; 53.63074°N 2.36353°W		1890–92	A stone church consisting of a nave, a chancel, a north transept, a southeast vestry, and an unfinished tower-porch. Along the sides of the church are four-light windows between which are buttresses. Inside the church is a hammerbeam roof.	U
Charter Street Ragged School and Working Girls Home	Manchester; 53.48957°N 2.23658°W		1891	The original school had been built in 1866. Maxwell and Tuke added a wing in 1891, and replaced the original block in 1898. In addition to educating poor children, it provided separate accommodation for servant girls.	U
Blackpool Tower	Blackpool, Lancashire; 53.81577°N 3.05521°W		1891–94	The tower is built in open steel girders standing on concrete blocks. At the top are four galleries, the upper three being open, and an ogee-shaped cap. The tower has a square plan, it tapers from a width of 100 feet (30 m) at the bottom to 30 feet (9 m) under the main gallery, and is 518 feet (158 m) high. Within the base the architects included an arena and a circus.	I
Bank and heritage centre	Port Sunlight, Merseyside; 53.34900°N 2.99702°W		1896	This was built originally as four hostels for girls, and was later used as a bank and heritage centre. The building is in two storeys and four bays. The ground floor is in brick with bay windows, above this is a pargetted frieze, and the upper storey is timber-framed with jettied decorated gables.	II
New Brighton Tower	New Brighton, Merseyside		1897–1900	At 567 feet 6 inches (173 m) this was the highest building in Britain. It was higher than Blackpool Tower but with a generally similar design. The architects added substantial buildings at the base about 90 feet (27 m) high including a large theatre and a large ballroom. It cost about £200,000. The tower was demolished in 1919–21, leaving only the ballroom, which was itself demolished in 1969 following a fire.	—
15 and 17 King Street	Manchester; 53.48140°N 2.24681°W		1902	Built as a shop on a corner site for Goodall's and with various owners since. It has timber-framed cladding and a slate roof, and is in Tudor Revival style. The shop is in four storeys with five bays on one front, three on the other and a curved bay between. On top of the corner is an octagonal turret with a cupola.	II
Pavilion and kiosks, North Pier	Blackpool, Lancashire; 53.81894°N 3.05638°W	—	1903	The pavilion and entrance kiosks were in "oriental style". They have since been rebuilt and altered.	—
Rhyl Pavilion	Rhyl, Denbighshire	—	1908	The building was a structure on the sea front with a large dome. It included a theatre seating 1,000 people and cost £16,500 to build. The building was demolished in 1974.	—
Whitehead Clock Tower	Bury, Greater Manchester; 53.58925°N 2.30078°W		1914	The memorial tower is built in Portland stone on a stepped plinth of Aberdeen granite. At the top is a belfry without bells but with corner pinnacles. The belfry is surmounted by a copper ogee-shaped roof. Below it are clock faces on four sides, and below these is elaborate decoration.	II
