= Southport Arts Centre =

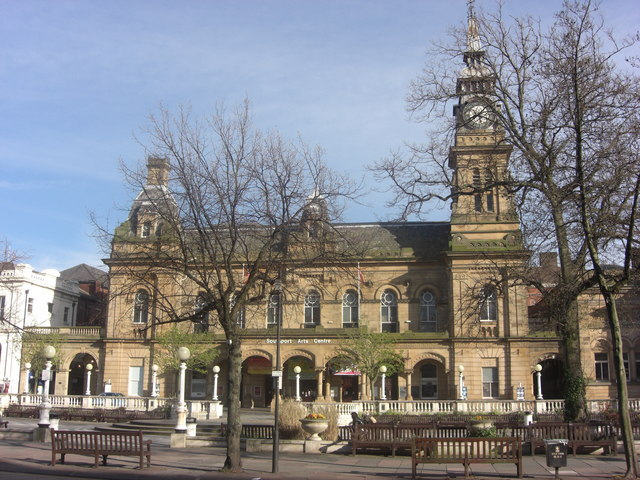
- Southport Arts Centre

- Location within Southport town centre
- 53.6472°N 3.0060°W
- Location: Lord Street, Southport, Sefton, Merseyside, England
- OS grid reference: SD 336 172

History
- Built: 1873–74
- Built for: Southport Corporation

Site notes
- Architect(s): Maxwell and Tuke
- Architectural styles: Mixed including Italian Gothic and French Renaissance elements
- Governing body: Sefton Metropolitan Borough Council

Listed Building – Grade II
- Designated: 15 November 1972
- Reference no.: 1379674

Southport Arts Centre, formerly known as Cambridge Hall, is on the east side of Lord Street, Southport, Sefton, Merseyside, England, and stands between Southport Town Hall and the Atkinson Art Gallery and Library. It was built in 1873–74 and originally contained an assembly hall. The centre contains mixed architectural styles and has a tall clock tower at the right end. During the 20th century the assembly hall was converted into a theatre, and it forms part of the arts complex known as The Atkinson. The arts centre is recorded in the National Heritage List for England as a designated Grade II listed building.

== History ==
The arts centre was built in 1873–74 and was designed by Maxwell and Tuke. (Note: James Maxwell and (William) Charles Tuke formed an architectural partnership in Bury, and later moved to Manchester. Their most notable building was Blackpool Tower.) It initially contained an assembly hall on the first floor. The foundation stone was laid by Princess Mary of Cambridge and the building was originally named after her. The assembly hall was converted into a theatre in the 20th century. As of 2014 the organisation of the centre is integrated with the Atkinson Art Gallery and Library and it is known as The Atkinson.

== Architecture ==
The centre is constructed in sandstone ashlar with a slate roof. Its architectural style is mixed, with elements of Italian Gothic and French Renaissance styles together with "Victorian incised ornament". The building is in two storeys with attics and has a symmetrical nine-baysfront, excluding the towers. Running along the ground floor is a loggia incorporating a porte cochère in the central three bays. The loggia forms an arcade of segmental arches carried on cylindrical columns with crocketed capitals. Behind the loggia are round-headed entrances and segmental-headed windows. The outer bays project forward, their lower storey is rusticated, and it contains a square-headed window with voussoirs. In the upper floor, each bay contains a tall round-headed window with moulded imposts. Between the floors is a frieze and a cornice. Atop the building are three towers, one at each end and one in the centre. The tallest is the clock tower at the right end of the front facing Lord Street. This has a tall belfry, above which are clock faces on all four sides, and an elaborate lead-clad spire. The tower is 132 feet (40 m) high and was fitted with five bells and a Cambridge-chiming clock by J. B. Joyce & Co of Whitchurch. At the left end of the same front is a smaller tower with a Baroque-style roof, and in the centre is a tower-like attic dormer. Along the top of the building, between the towers, is a dentilled cornice with a pierced parapet. The interior of the centre contains an entrance hall with a coffered ceiling, and a stone staircase with florid Gothic columns. On the left of the front of the building facing Lord Street is the two-bay entrance to the Cambridge Arcade, and on the right is an arch linking it to the Atkinson Art Gallery and Library. Both of these have inscribed friezes, and both are included in the listing.

== Present day ==
The arts centre forms part of the complex known as The Atkinson. On the left side of the entrance on the front facing Lord Street is a shop selling craft items, and on the right side is a small café known as the Bakery, The upper floors are occupied by a theatre and a performance space known as the Studio. The theatre seats 440 people and has a proscenium arch and facilities for cinema projection. The Studio can be used for a variety of purposes and it includes a permanent stage and balcony seating.

== Appraisal ==
Southport Arts Centre was designated as a Grade II listed building on 15 November 1972. Grade II is the lowest of the three grades of listing and is applied to buildings that are "nationally important and of special interest". The arts centre forms a group with other Grade II listed buildings nearby, the Atkinson Art Gallery and Library, and the Town Hall.

== See also ==
- Listed buildings in Southport
- List of works by Maxwell and Tuke
