= St George's United Reformed Church, Southport =

Coordinates: 53.64951°N 3.00226°W

St George's Church, Southport
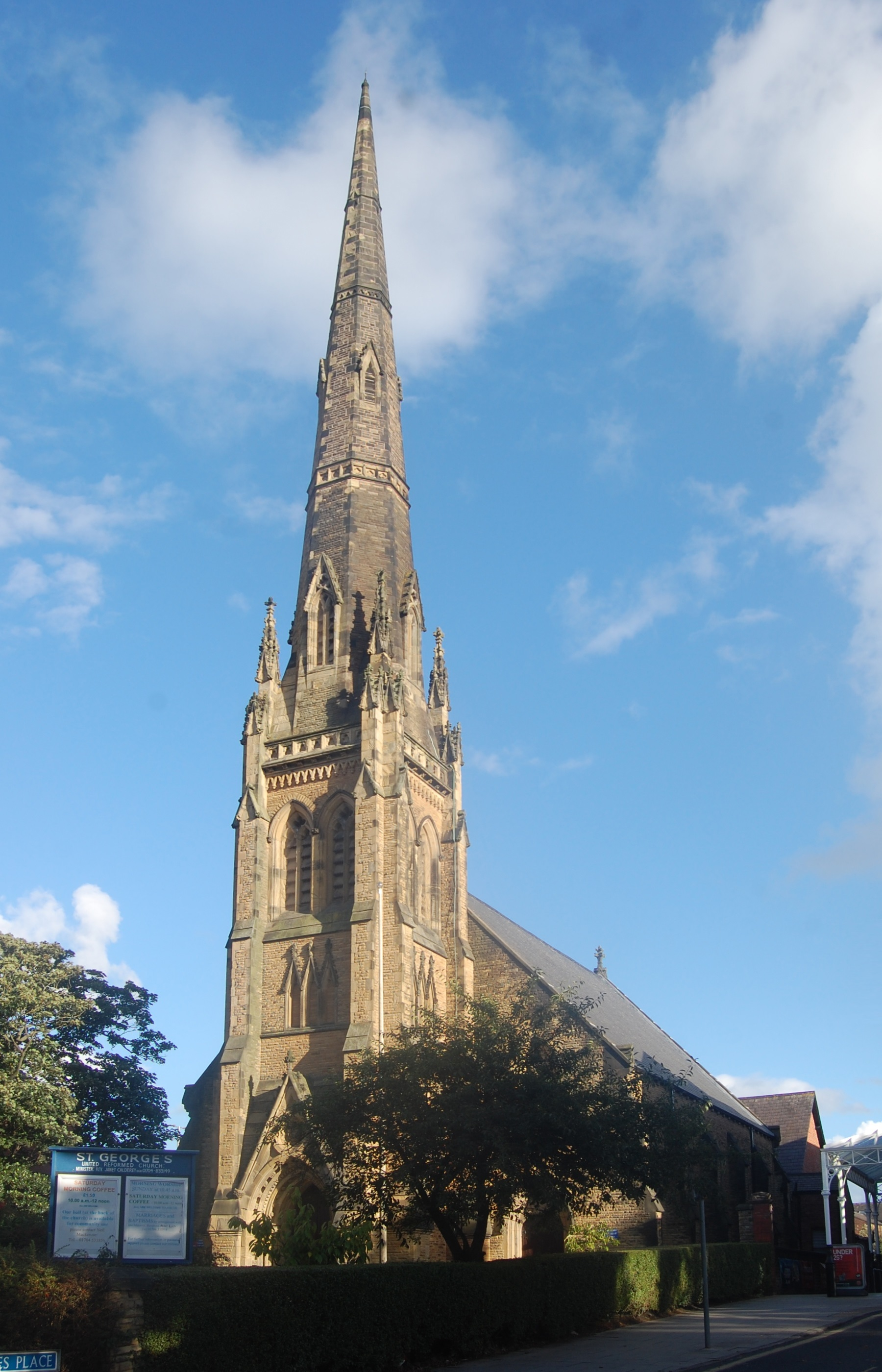
- St George's Church, Southport, from the southwest

- Location in Merseyside
- OS grid reference: SD 339 175
- Location: Lord Street, Southport, Sefton, Merseyside
- Country: England
- Denomination: United Reformed Church
- Website: St George, Southport

History
- Dedication: Saint George

Architecture
- Functional status: Active
- Heritage designation: Grade II
- Designated: 15 November 1972
- Architect: Thomas Wylie
- Architectural type: Church
- Style: Gothic Revival
- Groundbreaking: 1873
- Completed: 1874

Specifications
- Materials: Sandstone, slate roof

St George's Church is in Lord Street, Southport, Sefton, Merseyside, England, and is an active United Reformed Church. It is recorded in the National Heritage List for England as a designated Grade II listed building.

== History ==
The church was built in 1873–74 as a Presbyterian Church and was designed by Thomas Wylie. It was altered in 1931 by Irvine and Mosscrip, and later became a United Reformed Church.

== Architecture ==
=== Exterior ===
St George's is constructed in coursed rock-faced sandstone rubble and has a slate roof. Its architectural style is that of about 1300. The church consists of a five bay nave, and a west steeple consisting of a three-stage tower with a tall broach spire. The tower has angle buttresses, and in its lowest stage is a west doorway with a porch. The porch has a steep gable and is elaborately decorated with colonnettes, crocketed coping, and a finial. In the middle stage is a triple niche with crocketed trefoils, and in the top stage are pairs of two-light louvred bell openings with hood moulds. Above these are an arcaded frieze, a pierced parapet, and corner pinnacles. On the spire are two tiers of lucarnes. At the west end of the nave, flanking the tower, are arched doorways with two-light arched windows above. The bays of the nave are separated by buttresses, and each bay contains a three-light window with plate tracery.

=== Interior ===
The interior of the church consists of a single nave. At the west end is a wooden and glazed arcaded screen. There is another screen at the east end; this is wooden, arcaded, in Gothic style, and is integrated with a dais and reading desk. There are two schemes of stained glass in the windows, one by Heaton, Butler and Bayne, and the other by Shrigley and Hunt.

== Appraisal ==
On 15 November 1972 the church was designated as a Grade II listed building. Grade II is the lowest of the three grades of listing and is applied to buildings that are "nationally important and of special interest".

== Present day ==
As an active United Reformed Church it organises service and various group activities, and also provides morning coffee for the general public.

== See also ==
- Listed buildings in Southport
