= Marine Way Bridge =

Road bridge in Southport, England

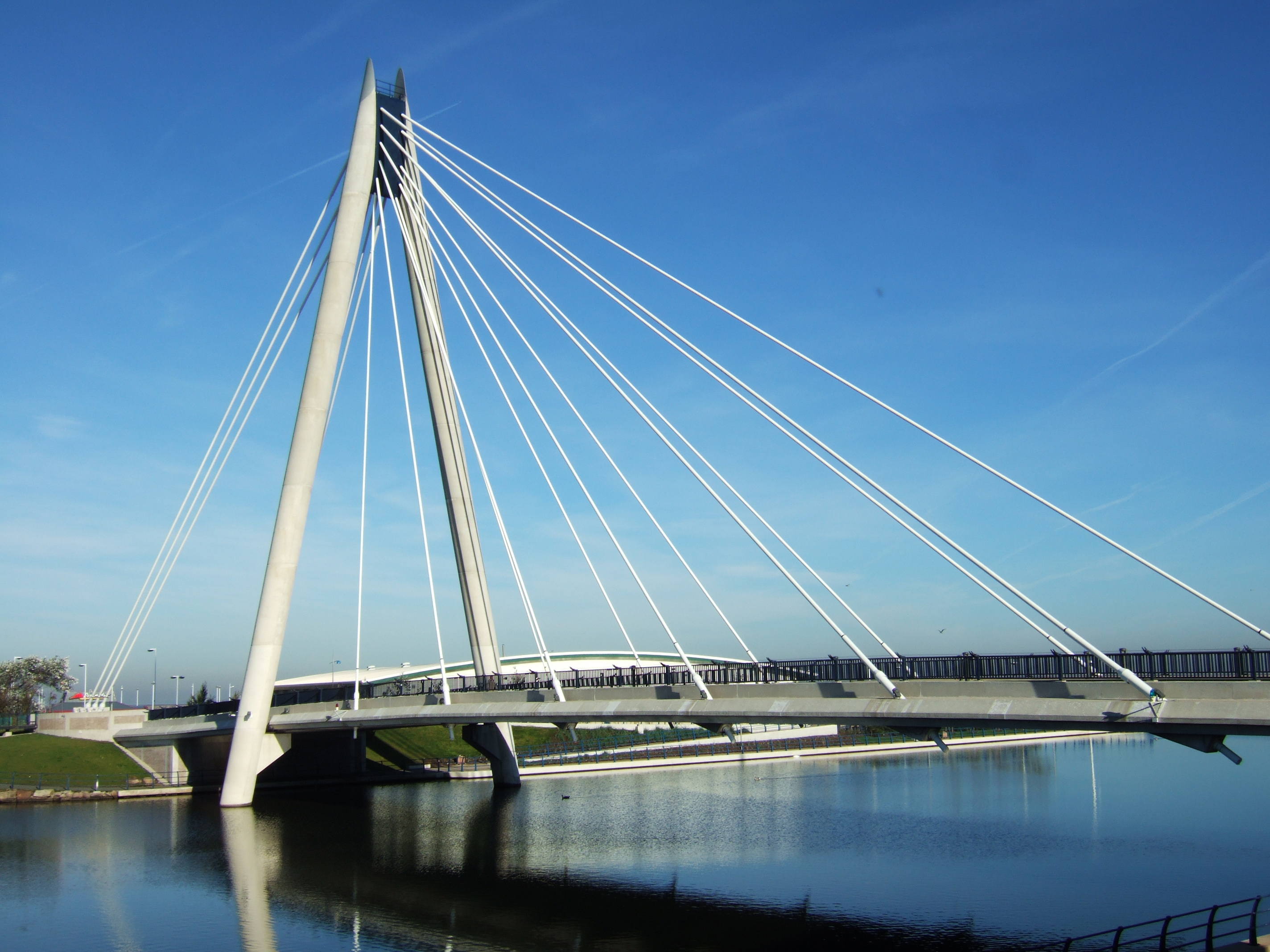
- Marine Way Bridge in October 2007
- Coordinates: 53.6515°N 3.0093°W
- Carries: Marine Parade
- Locale: Southport

Characteristics
- Design: Cable-stayed
- Total length: 150 metres
- Width: 19 metres
- Longest span: 80 metres
- No. of lanes: 2

History
- Constructed by: Balfour Beatty
- Opened: 17 May 2004

Location
- Interactive map of Marine Way Bridge

The Marine Way Bridge is a cable-stayed bridge in Southport, England.

The bridge was designed by Babtie (now part of Jacobs) with architect Nicol Russell Studios and was built by Balfour Beatty to replace a cast-iron bridge that closed in 1990. With a main span of 80 metres (262 ft) and a total length of 150 metres (492 ft), it opened for traffic on 17 May 2004.

It was officially opened by Prince Edward, Earl of Wessex, and Sophie, Countess of Wessex, on 19 July 2004.
