= William Sutton (hotelier) =

English businessman

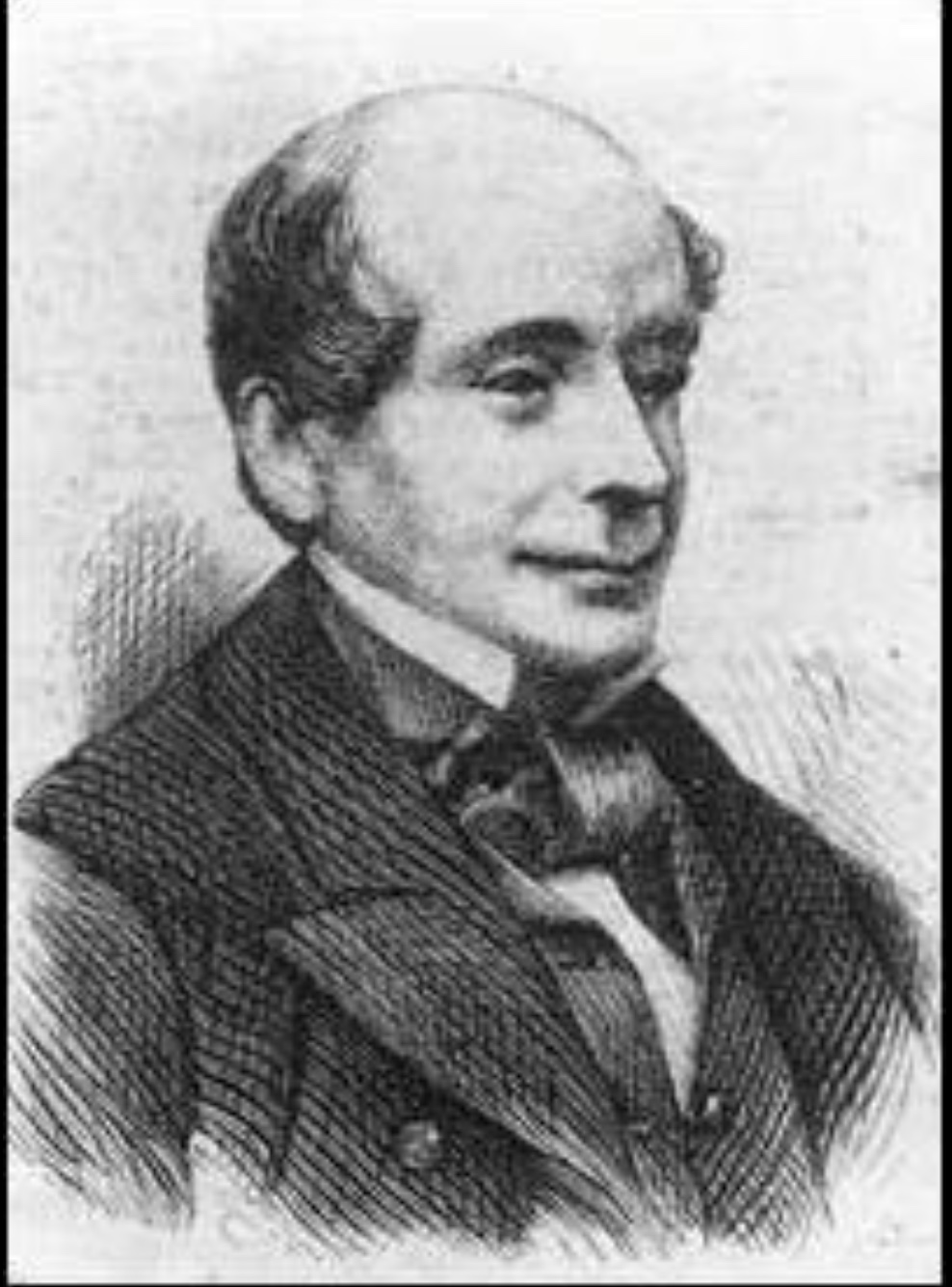
Portrait of William Sutton, founder of Southport

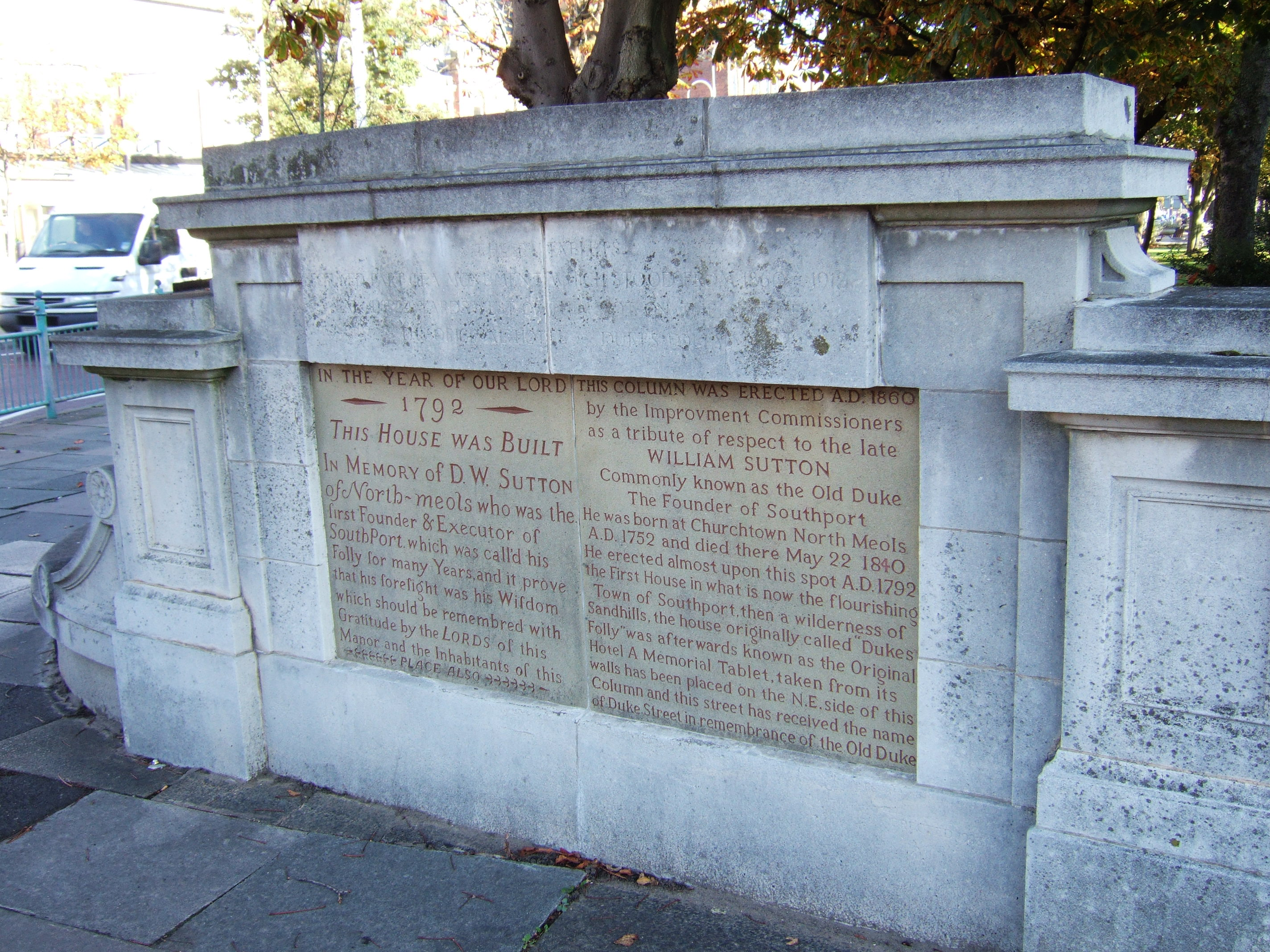
Plaque dedicated to William Sutton, situated on the corner of Duke Street in Southport.

William Sutton (1752 – 1840 in North Meols, Lancashire), also known as The Mad Duke or The Old Duke) was an entrepreneur from North Meols (North of Southport). In 1792, Sutton took advantage of the fashionable new trend of sea bathing by building a bathing house at South Hawes (2 miles [3 km] south of Churchtown). Realizing the importance and opportunity presented by the newly created canal systems, he gambled on the idea of constructing a hotel by the seaside. His hotel was just 4 miles [6 km] away from the newly constructed Leeds and Liverpool Canal, to and from which he arranged transport for potential guests.

Born in 1752, he was originally the landlord of the Black Bull Inn in Churchtown (now the Hesketh Arms) and known as a good-natured, jovial gentleman who entertained his regulars by playing the fiddle.

He constructed his "Original Hotel" at the southern end of what is now the mile-long and much-admired Lord Street, but was nothing of the sort at the time. Rather, the project became a source of disbelief and amusement to the folk of Churchtown and Meols, who referred to William Sutton as "The Mad Duke" and the hotel as "Duke's Folly". The hotel was described as being 'in the southern hawes of nowhere' at the time.

Over time Lord Street grew, with the hotel anchoring the southern end, helping to create its own more respectable address.

Nowadays, the town of 93,000 still pays tribute to its founder with a notable plaque made up of two stone tablets set in a cornerstone at Duke Street/Lord Street. One tablet was taken from the wall of Sutton's original hotel, while the other was made in 1860 shortly after the hotel was demolished, both being mounted on a square memorial plinth, topped by a lamp post. This memorial stood close to the corner of the site of the hotel, and would today have been near the middle of the present roundabout. The tablets were re-sited to create the present memorial when the road layout was remodelled in the early 20th century. Around the corner in Duke Street is a hotel dating from 1861 which bears the name Dukes Folly Hotel. His own later life is uncertain. It is understood that William "Duke" Sutton, who died on May 22, 1840, aged 88, actually ended his life in Lancaster gaol for debtors – "on the fiddle or just fiddling?", as someone supposedly expressed it at the time. He is buried in St Cuthberts Church, (Churchtown).
