= Southport Model Railway Village =

Tourist attraction in Lancashire, England

- Interactive map of Southport Model Railway Village
- Location: Lower Promenade, Kings Gardens, Southport, Merseyside, England
- Coordinates: 53.6487°N 3.0105°W
- Opened: 1996
- Theme: Miniature village, garden railway
- Operating season: April – October
- Area: 1.5 acres (0.61 ha)
- Website: www.southportmodelrailwayvillage.co.uk

Location in Southport town centre

Southport Model Railway Village is a tourist attraction located in Southport, England. It is a model village with a focus on trains and railways.

== History ==
In 1995, Southport residents Ray and Jean Jones were granted permission by Sefton MBC to design and build a model village at Kings Gardens, Southport. Together with their team of craftsmen they transformed an area within the seafront into a miniature landscape. This became the first model railway village in the United Kingdom, due to the focus of the attraction on the miniature railway. When it opened to the public in 1996 it was the largest outdoor display of G gauge railway in the United Kingdom. The Jones family still run Southport Model Railway Village today.

== Railway ==
Movement is generated in the model railway village by one of the largest 45 mm garden railway systems in the United Kingdom. It has five LGB trains continuously running on 500 metres of track.

== Miniature landscape ==
The site is approximately 1.5 acres (0.61 ha) and the miniature landscape is set at 1:18 scale. There are over 200 models along with 500 m of model train track in the village. The attraction features architectural styles from Merseyside and West Lancashire.

Buildings are constructed with marine plywood and resin. Each building is designed and constructed on site by an in-house manufacturing base, which supplies miniature resin items such as doors, windows roofing sections and miniature people.

Spanning the site is a waterway which connects two natural ponds.

Notable features include:

Model railway; Railway station; Castle	Windmill; Watermill; Churches	Manor house; Shops; Factory

== In popular culture ==
Television appearances include:

- BBC One Foot in the Past (aired 1996)
- Various regional television news items
- Granada Tonight
- To Buy or Not to Buy (Series 8 Episode 12)
