= Mae Bamber =

English politician, entertainer, and author (1898–1987)

Mary Ottilie H. H. Klüh "Mae" Bamber (née Miller; 6 February 1898 – 31 August 1987) was an English politician, entertainer, and author who was mayor of Southport, Lancashire.

Bamber was born in Chatham, Kent, the daughter of Scottish musician Edward Miller, and Marie Ottilie Klüh from Hanau-am-Main, Hesse, Germany. She grew up in Scotland where her father taught at the Carnegie School of Music. In her teens, she moved to Southport. In 1958, Mayor Bamber travelled to the United States to visit three American cities called Southport. She was a guest on the American version of What's My Line? on March 23, 1958.

She married Richard Frederick "Dickie" Bamber, who operated a bicycle shop and later a chain of garages. He died in 1971. She died in Southport in 1987.
