= Southport =

Town in Merseyside, England

Coordinates: 53°38′51″N 3°0′19″W

- Town
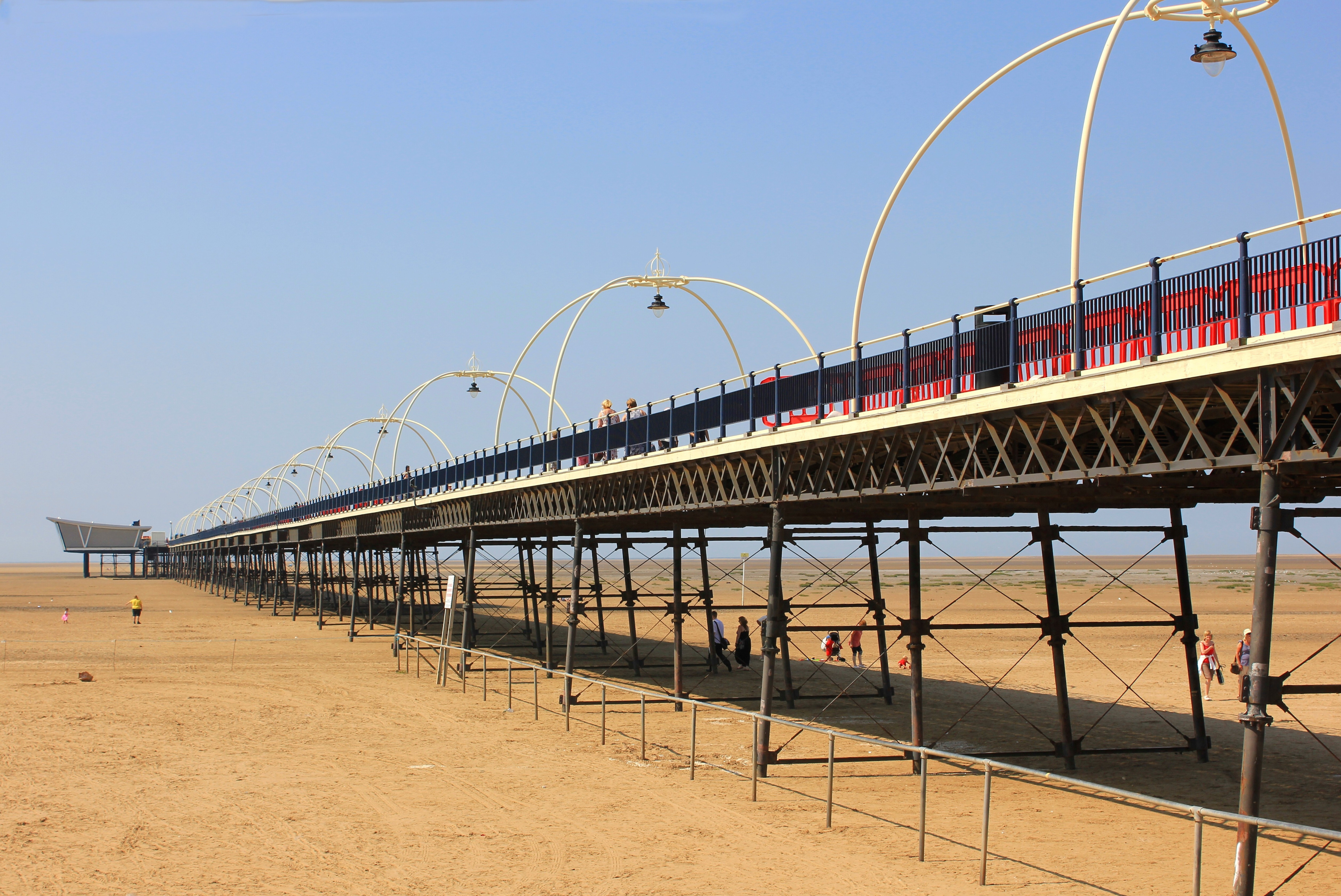
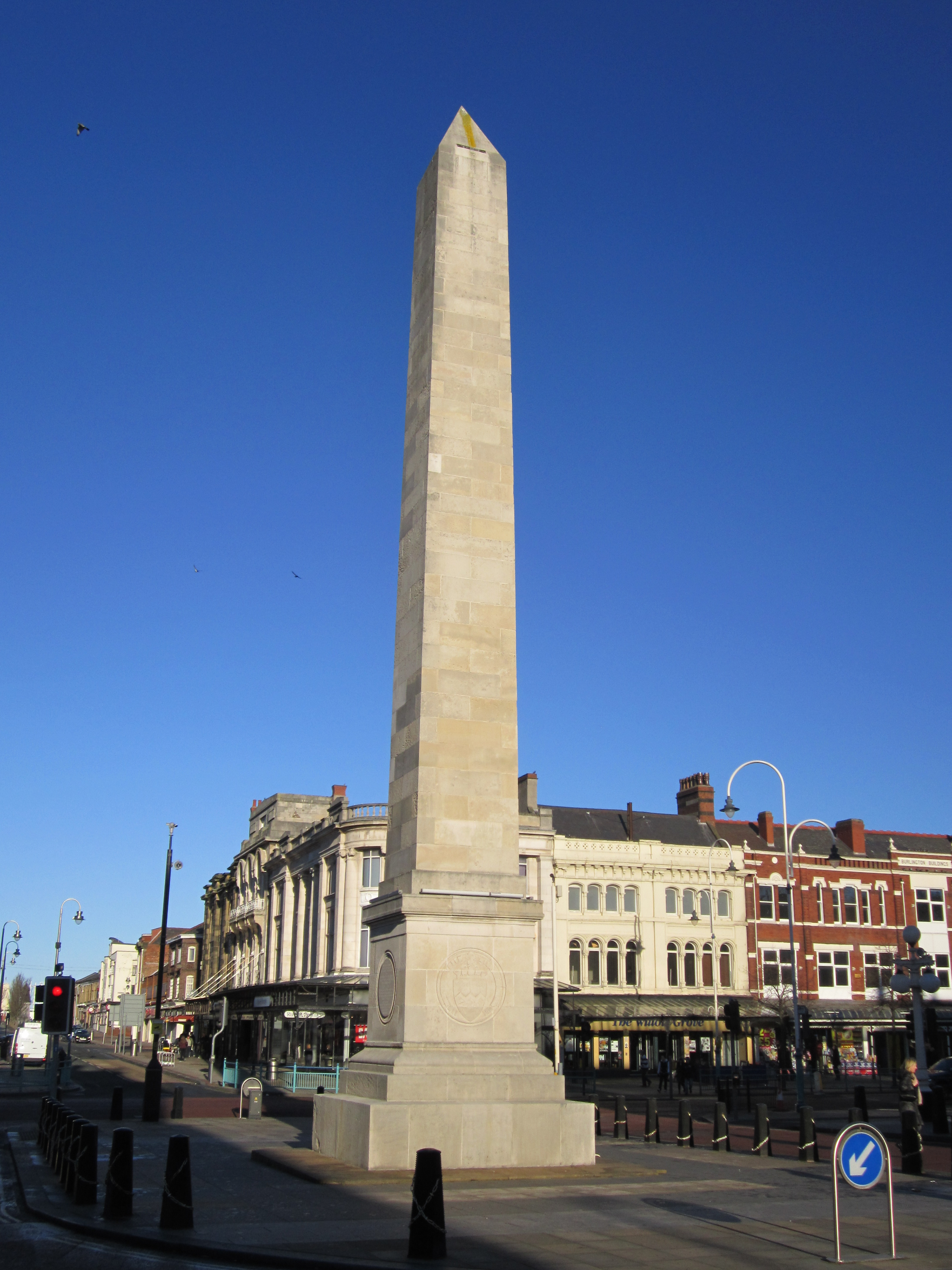
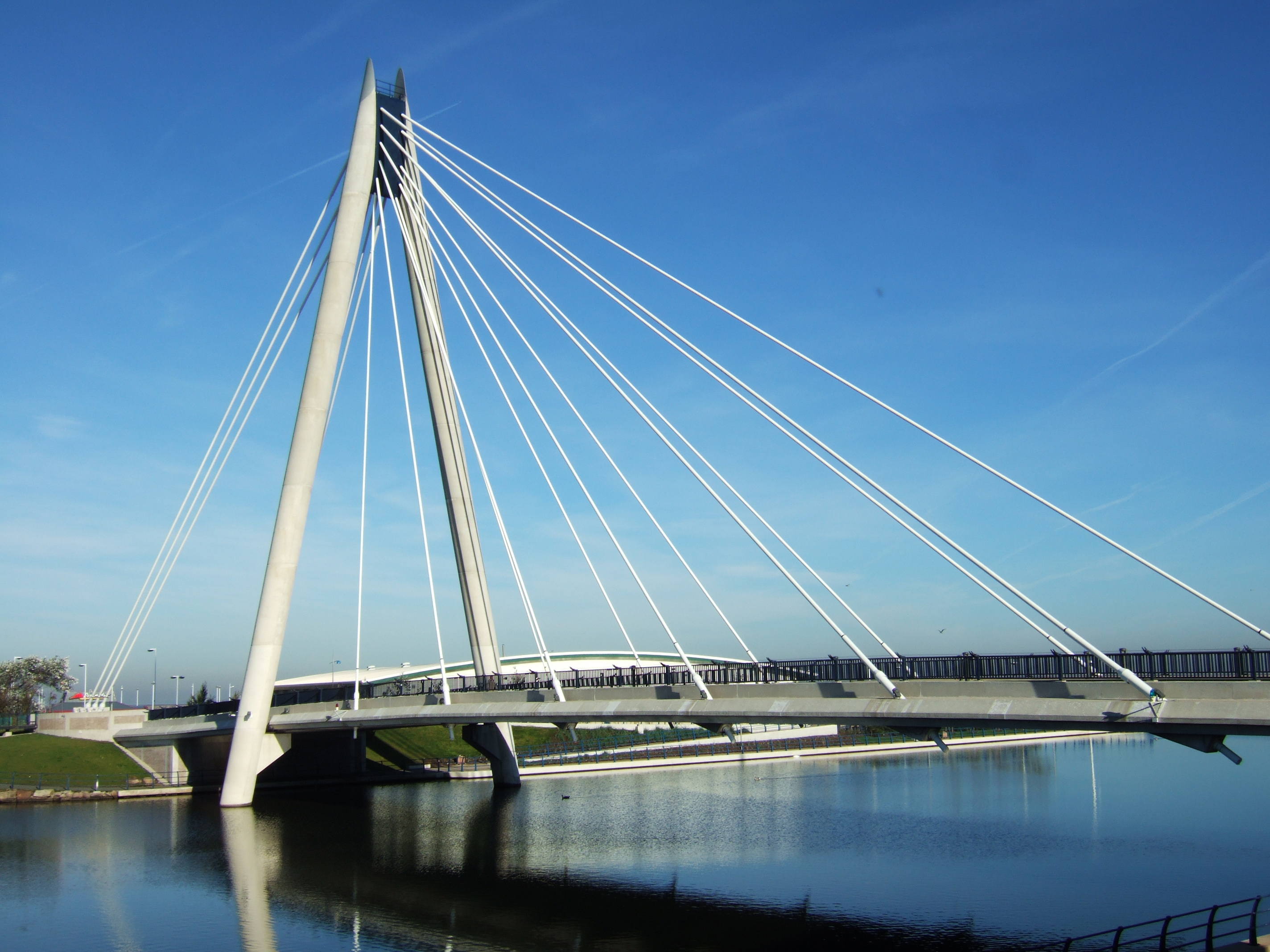
- Southport Pier, the war memorial, and Marine Way Bridge

- Location within Merseyside
- Population: 94,421 (2021 census)
- Demonym: Sandgrounder
- OS grid reference: SD333170
  - London: 191 mi (307 km) SE
- Metropolitan borough: Sefton
- Metropolitan county: Merseyside
- Region: North West
- Country: England
- Sovereign state: United Kingdom
- Districts of the town: List: Ainsdale (Village); Banks (Village); Birkdale; Blowick; Churchtown; Crossens; High Park; Hillside; Kew; Lord Street; Marshside; Meols Cop; Woodvale
- Post town: Southport
- Postcode district: PR8, PR9
- Dialling code: 01704
- Police: Merseyside
- Fire: Merseyside
- Ambulance: North West
- UK Parliament: Southport

Southport is a seaside town in the Metropolitan Borough of Sefton in Merseyside, England. It lies on the West Lancashire coastal plain and the east coast of the Irish Sea, approximately 17 miles (27 km) north of Liverpool and 15 miles (24 km) southwest of Preston. At the 2021 census, Southport had a population of 94,421, making it the eleventh most populous settlement in North West England and the third most populous settlement in the Liverpool City Region.

The town was founded in 1792 by William Sutton, an innkeeper from Churchtown, who built a bathing house at what is now the south end of Lord Street. The area was previously known as South Hawes, and was sparsely populated and dominated by dunes. The area became popular with tourists due to the easy access from the nearby Leeds and Liverpool Canal, and by 1848 had a railway connection. The resort increased during the Victorian era and contains examples of Victorian architecture and town planning. Lord Street was developed as a wide, tree-lined shopping street, and attractions such as Southport Pier, which is the second longest seaside pleasure pier in the British Isles, were constructed. A particular feature of the town is the extensive tree planting. This was one of the conditions required by the Hesketh family when they made land available for development in the 19th century. Hesketh Park at the northern end of the town is named after them, having been built on land donated by Rev. Charles Hesketh.

Extensive sand dunes stretch for several miles from Woodvale to Birkdale, the south of the town. The Ainsdale dunes have been designated as a national nature reserve and a Ramsar site. Local fauna include the natterjack toad and the sand lizard. Southport hosts events, including an annual air show on and over the beach, the largest independent flower show in the UK in Victoria Park, and the British Musical Fireworks Championship. The town is at the centre of England's "Golf Coast", and has hosted the Open Championship at the Royal Birkdale Golf Club.

== Etymology ==
The town gets its name from the South Port Hotel; built around 1797 (see #18th century).

== History ==
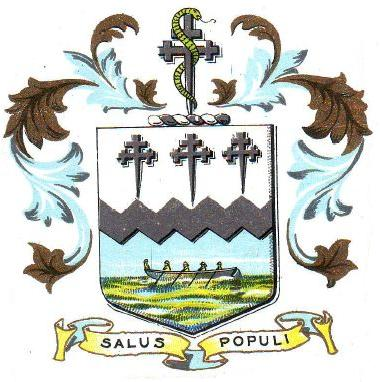
The coat of arms of Southport

=== 10th–17th century ===
There have been settlements in the area now comprising Southport since the Domesday Book, and some parts of the town have names of Viking origin. The earliest recorded human activity in the region was during the Middle Stone Age when mesolithic hunter-gatherers were attracted by the abundant red deer and elk populations, as well as the availability of fish, shellfish, and woodland.

Roman coins have been found at Halsall Moss and Crossens, although the Romans never settled southwest Lancashire.

The first objective evidence of an early settlement in the region is in the Domesday Book, in which the area is called Otergimele. The Domesday Book states that there were 50 huts in Otergimele, housing a population 200. The population was scattered thinly across the region, and it was at the northeast end of Otergimele (present-day Crossens), where blown sand gave way to alluvial deposits from the River Ribble estuary, that a small concentration of people occurred.

It was here that a primitive church might have been built, which gave the emerging village its name of Churchtown, the parish being North Meols (pronounced "meals"). A church called St Cuthbert's is still at the centre of Churchtown.

With a booming fishing industry, the area grew and hamlets became part of the parish of North Meols. From south to north, these villages were South Hawes, Haweside, Little London, Higher Blowick, Lower Blowick, Rowe-Lane, Churchtown, Marshside, Crossens, and Banks. As well as Churchtown, there were vicarages in Crossens and Banks.

Parts of the parish were almost completely surrounded by water until 1692 when Thomas Fleetwood of Bank Hall cut a channel to drain Martin Mere to the sea. From this point on, attempts at large-scale drainage of Martin Mere and other marshland continued until the 19th century, since when the water has been pumped away. This left behind a legacy of fine agricultural soil and created a booming farming industry.

=== 18th century ===
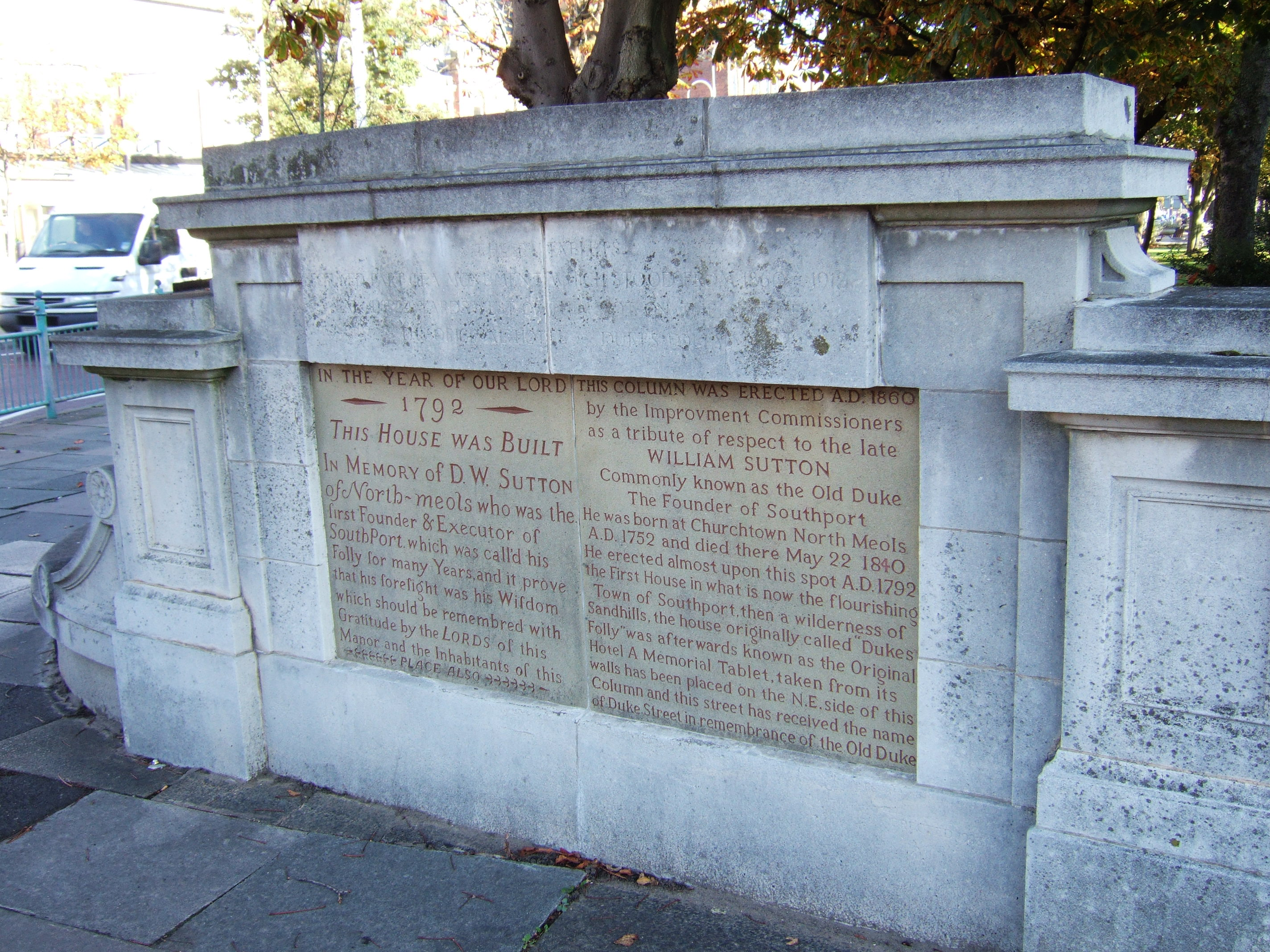
Plaque dedicated to William Sutton, on the corner of Duke Street

In the late 18th century, it was becoming fashionable for the well-to-do to desert inland spa towns and visit the seaside to bathe in the salt sea waters. At that time, doctors recommended bathing in the sea to help cure aches and pains. In 1792, William Sutton, the landlord of the Black Bull Inn in Churchtown (now the Hesketh Arms) and known to locals as "The Old Duke", realised the importance of the newly created canal systems across the UK and set up a bathing house in the virtually uninhabited dunes at South Hawes by the seaside just four miles (6 km) away from the newly constructed Leeds and Liverpool Canal and two miles southwest of Churchtown. When a widow from Wigan built a cottage nearby in 1797 for seasonal lodgers, Sutton quickly built a new inn on the site of the bathing house which he called the South Port Hotel, moving to live there the following season. There was no port, but "Southport" soon became the name of the town. The locals thought him mad and referred to the building as the Duke's Folly, but Sutton arranged transport links from the canal that ran through Scarisbrick, four miles from the hotel, and trade was remarkably good. The hotel survived until 1854, when it was demolished to make way for traffic at the end of Lord Street, but its presence and the impact of its founder are marked by a plaque in the vicinity, by the name of one street at the intersection, namely Duke Street, and by a hotel on Duke Street which bears the legacy name of Dukes Folly Hotel.

=== 19th century ===
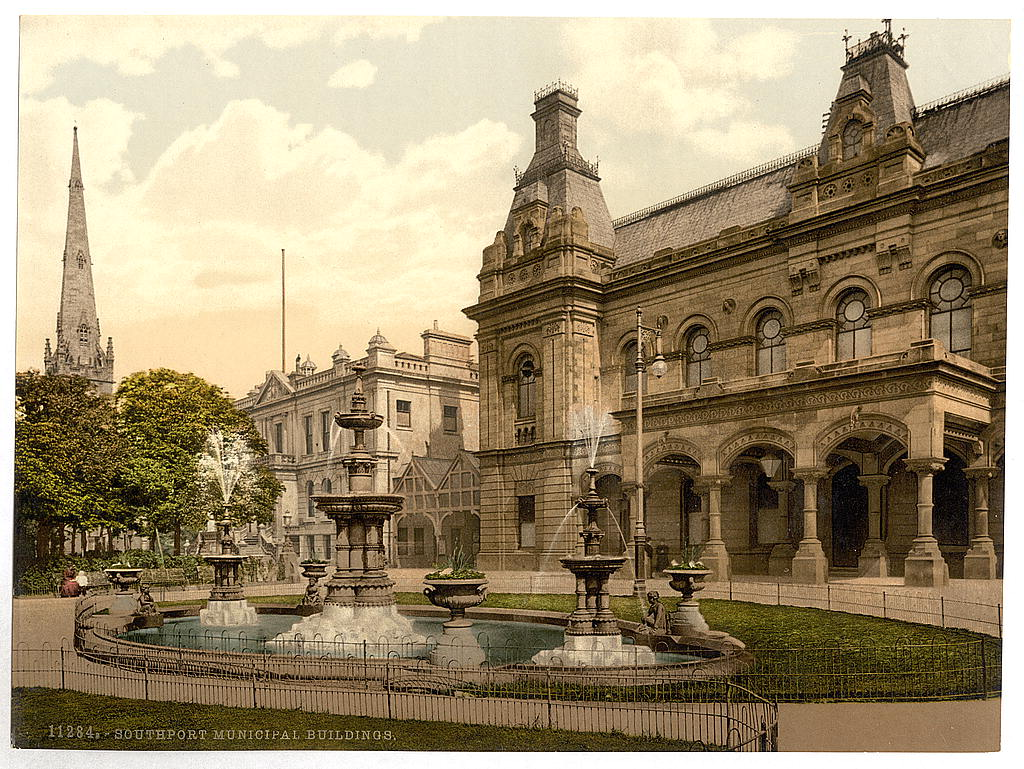
Municipal buildings, Southport, England, ca. 1890 – 1900

Southport grew quickly in the 19th century as it gained a reputation for being a more refined seaside resort than its neighbour Blackpool. Southport had a head start compared to all the other places on the Lancashire coast because it had easy access to the canal system. Other seaside bathing areas could not really get going until the railways were built some years later. The Leeds and Liverpool canal brought people from Liverpool, Manchester, Bolton and Wigan amongst others. By 1820 Southport had over 20,000 visitors per year.

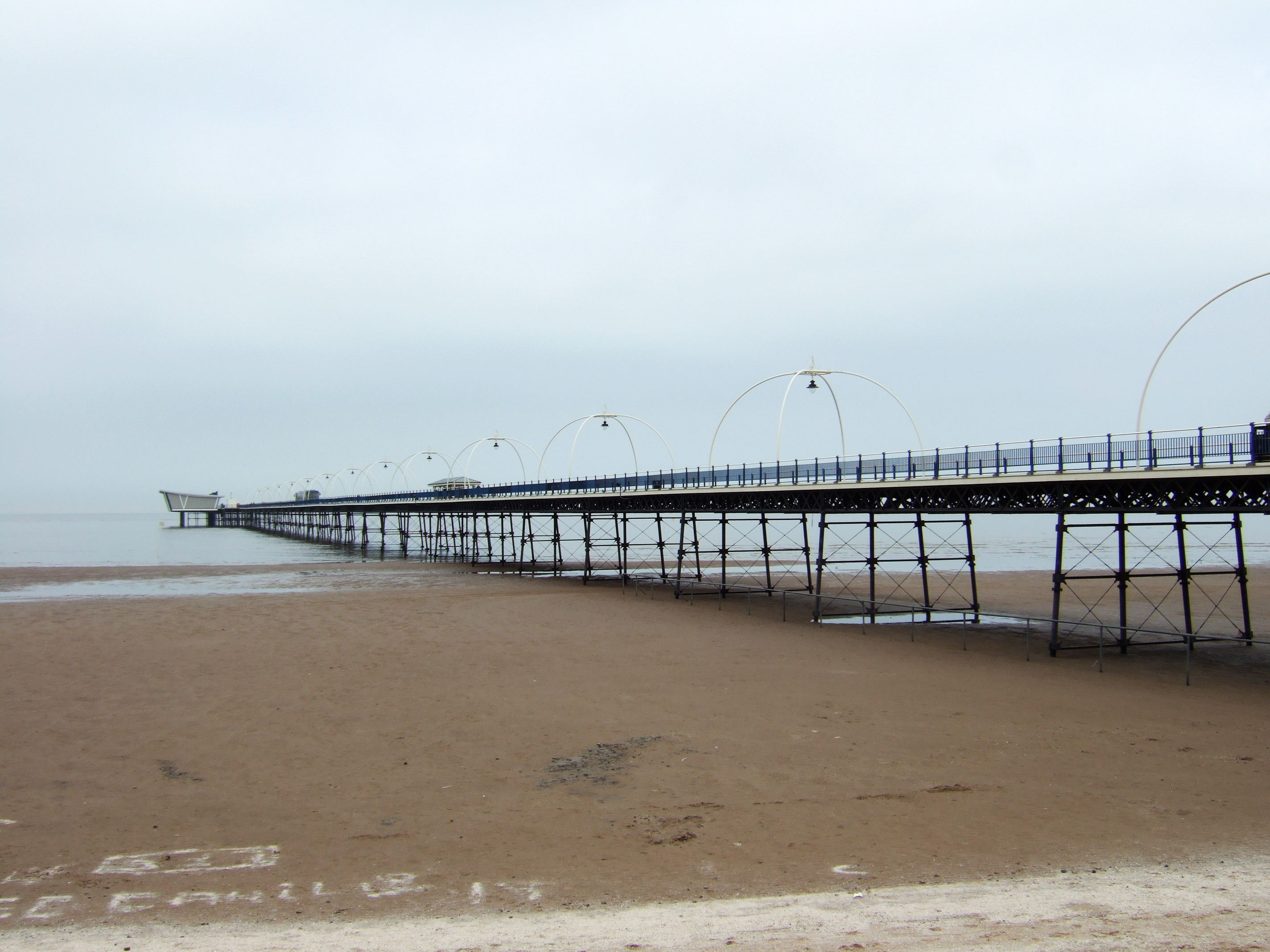
Southport Pier is a Grade II listed structure. At 3,650 feet (1,110 m), it is the second longest in Great Britain.

Southport Pier is referred to as the first true "pleasure pier", being one of the earliest pier structures to be erected using iron. A design from James Brunlees was approved at a cost of £8,700 and on 4 August 1859 a large crowd witnessed the driving home of the first support pile. The opening of the pier was celebrated on 2 August 1860.

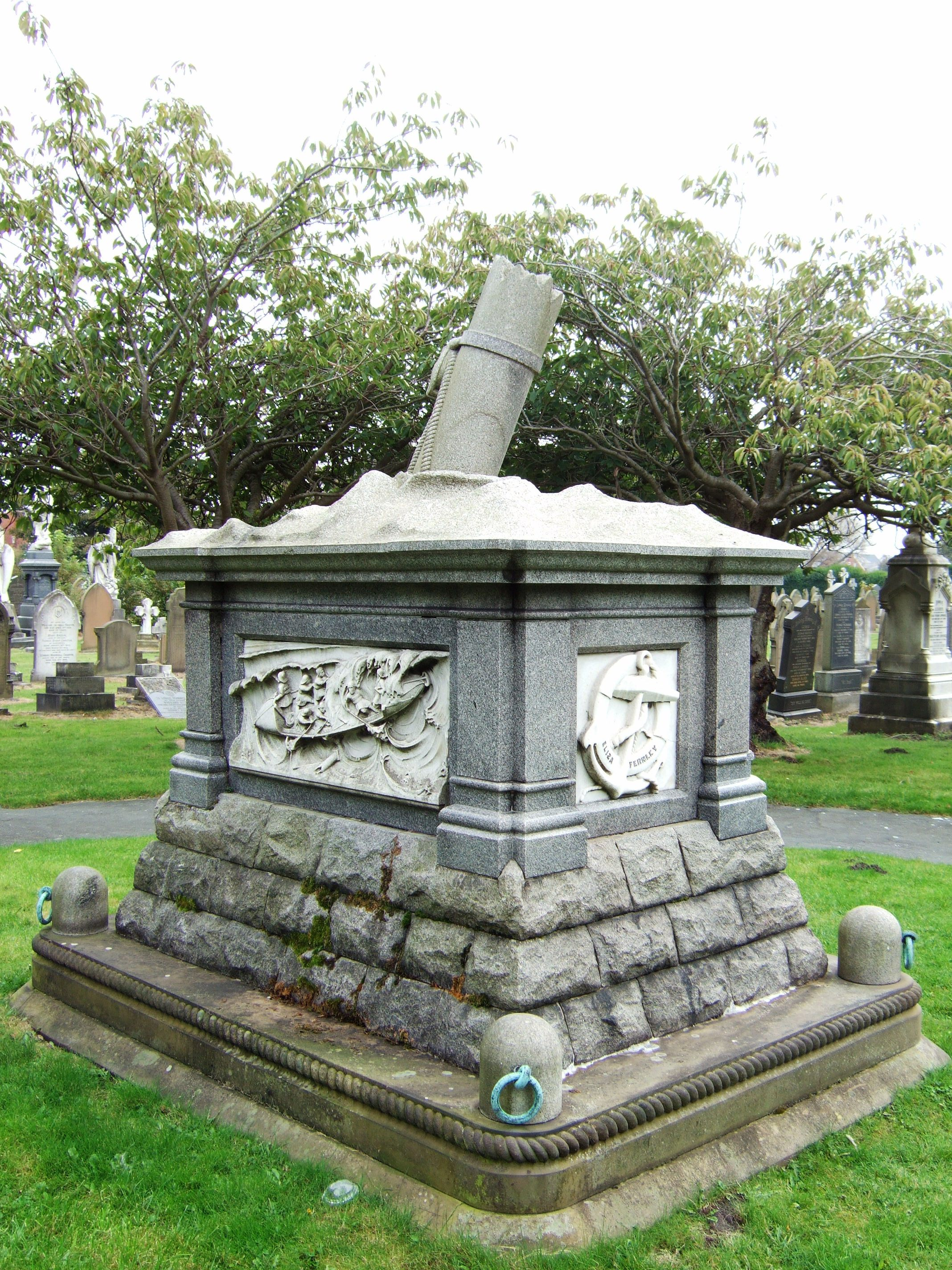
Memorial to the crew of the Eliza Fernley lifeboat, in Duke Street Cemetery

On the night of 9 December 1886, the worst lifeboat disaster in the history of the UK occurred off the shores of Southport. A cargo ship called the Mexico was on its way to South America when it found itself in difficulty. Lifeboats from Lytham, St. Annes, and Southport set off to try to rescue those aboard the vessel. The crews battled against storm-force winds as they rowed towards the casualty. The entire crew from the St. Anne's boat was lost and all but two of the Southport crew were too. In all, 28 lifeboatmen were lost.

A memorial was erected in Duke Street Cemetery and there is a permanent display in the museum at The Atkinson on Lord Street. There is also a memorial inside the Lifeboat house, now operated by the Southport Offshore Rescue Trust. Mexico was just one of many shipwrecks in the Southport area.

=== 20th century ===
From 1894 to 1912 Birkdale and the adjoining village of Ainsdale were separate from Southport and administered by Birkdale Urban District Council before becoming part of the county borough of Southport in 1912. This was a huge expansion of the town.

In 1914, a very short romance story between a "2 park road Southport" private soldier and French lady took place in Valenciennes in north France during early First World War as described by Andrée Ducatez's Journal.

In 1925, the RNLI abandoned the station at Southport and left the town with no lifeboat. In the late 1980s, after a series of tragedies, local families from Southport raised the funds to buy a new lifeboat for the town, stationed at the old RNLI lifeboat house. The lifeboat, operated by the Southport Offshore Rescue Trust, is completely independent from the RNLI and receives no money from them. It relies entirely on donations from the general public.

On 16 March 1926, Henry Segrave set the land speed record in his 4-litre Sunbeam Tiger Ladybird on the sands at Southport at 152.33 mph (245.15 km/h). This record lasted for just over a month, until broken by J.G. Parry-Thomas.

=== 21st century ===
Southport elected their first ever Labour MP in the 2024 general election.

On 29 July 2024, three girls aged 6, 7 and 9 were murdered in a mass stabbing at a dance workshop on Hart Street, with eight children and two adults left injured. The next day a vigil was held for the victims. Later that evening, riots broke out and a mosque near Hart Street was attacked after Islamist link to the murders. Cars, including a police vehicle, were set on fire. More than fifty police officers were injured. Rioters travelled to Southport from other areas and included right-wing supporters. A shop was looted and members of the community came together to help the shopkeeper and clean up the streets.

Following the murders, thousands attended vigils and laid floral tributes to the victims in Town Hall Gardens. In June 2025, the families of the three murdered girls visited Downing Street to show the prime minister plans for a regeneration of the Gardens. The prime minister pledged £5 million towards the project, with the Liverpool City Region Combined Authority and Sefton Council having both allocated £2.5 million towards it.

== Governance ==
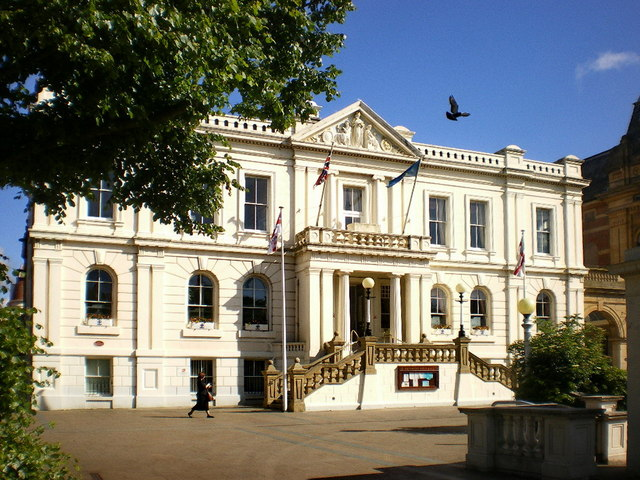
Southport Town Hall

In 2024 Southport elected its first ever Labour MP since the creation of the constituency in the 1880s, with Labour politician Patrick Hurley succeeding Conservative incumbent Damien Moore. Prior to that, Liberal Democrat John Pugh was the MP for Southport, holding the seat for 16 years until his retirement in the 2017 general election.

Southport is part of the Metropolitan Borough of Sefton, one of the six boroughs of the Liverpool City Region. It is governed by the Mayor of the Liverpool City Region, and the combined authority, which is responsible for areas of transport, trade and strategic governance of devolved powers in the town and wider Sefton Borough.

=== Lancashire (1866–1974) ===
Southport is located within the historic county of Lancashire, and was incorporated as a municipal borough in 1866. It became a county borough independent of the administrative county of Lancashire in 1905, having reached the minimum 50,000 population (the 1911 census gave a figure of 51,643). The Birkdale Urban District, including the parishes of Birkdale and Ainsdale was added to Southport in 1912. The county borough had its headquarters at Southport Town Hall.

=== Merseyside (1974–present) ===
==== Induction into the county of Merseyside ====
Under the 1971 Local Government White Paper, presented in February 1971, Southport would have lost its county borough status, becoming a non-metropolitan district within Lancashire. Rather than accept this fate and lose its separate education and social services departments, Southport Corporation lobbied for inclusion in the nearby planned metropolitan county of Merseyside, to join with Bootle and other units to form a district with the 250,000 required population. Under the Local Government Act 1972, Southport was duly included in the Metropolitan Borough of Sefton, which was established on 1 April 1974.

A recurring local political issue has been the cross-party movement campaigning for Southport to leave Sefton and form its own unitary authority, perhaps adjoined to the neighbouring West Lancashire authority. Support for this has been seen amongst Liberal Democrat councillors, and also within the Southport Conservative Party.

Southport-born Kevin Laroux Wood stood in the 1983 general election for the Southport Constituency. He was supported by a team of people who raised the funds needed and formed the "Southport Back in Lancashire Party". Posters were distributed and articles published in the Visiter newspaper. Although was not elected as MP, it put the issue firmly on the local agenda which continues to this day. In the same period in 1980, a Private Member's Bill proposed restoring Southport to Lancashire, and renaming the residue of Sefton to the Metropolitan Borough of Bootle. The Local Government Boundary Commission for England conducted a review of the area in 1987, which attracted 10,000 messages, of which "70% were pro forma". In 1990, the LGBC made suggestions that Southport, Ainsdale and Birkdale should be made a district of Lancashire: the final recommendations in 1991 "concluded that public opinion was more evenly divided than initially thought", and also that eastward transport links with Lancashire were poor compared to those southward to the Liverpool area.

==== Metropolitan Borough of Sefton ====
In December 1996 (after it had finished the work on the creation of unitary authorities), the government again directed the Local Government Commission for England to conduct a review, commencing in January 1997. This review was constrained by the legal inability of the commission to recommend that the current Sefton-West Lancashire border be altered. In a MORI poll conducted at the behest of the LGCE, 65% of Southport residents supported the campaign, compared to 37% in the borough as a whole. Local MPs Matthew Banks and Ronnie Fearn (MPs for Southport at various times) supported making Southport a unitary authority, with Banks wishing to see it tied to Lancashire ceremonially, but Fearn wishing to see it remain, as a separate borough, in Merseyside.

The commission noted that Southport would have a relatively low population for a unitary authority, even including Formby (89,300 or 114,700), and that it was worried about the viability of a south Sefton authority without Southport, and therefore recommended the status quo be kept. The commission suggested the use of area committees for the various parts of the borough and also that Southport could become a civil parish. Another request made in 2004 was turned down, the Electoral Commission must request such a review.

In 2002, a local independent party calling themselves the Southport Party was established, with many members supporting a policy of "Southport out of Sefton." Three council seats were won in the 2002 local elections, including that of the leader of Sefton Council, Liberal Democrat Councillor, David Bamber. At the following election there were no gains and a drop in the number of votes for the party. At the all out election in 2004, one of their councillors stood down, whilst the other two lost their seats.

To date, there have been no further moves to change Sefton's boundaries, but the Boundary Commission indicated in 2004 that a future review is possible.

From 2014 the Borough of Sefton became one of the six boroughs of the Liverpool City Region Combined Authority.

== Geography ==
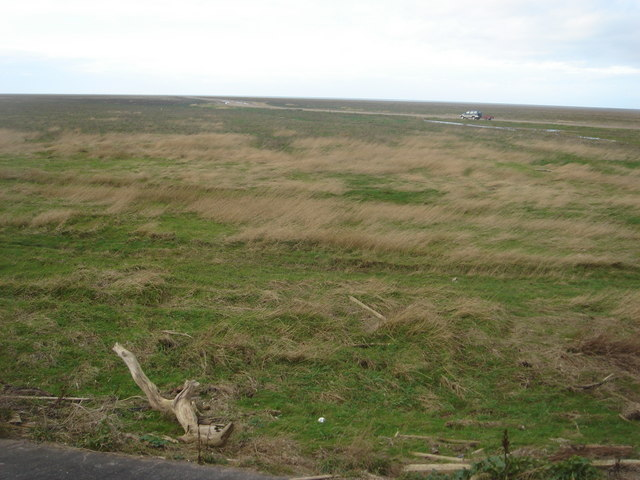
Marshside Sands, Southport

The closest cities are Preston 20 km (12 miles) to the north east and Liverpool 27 km (17 miles) to the south.

Existing on the West Lancashire Coastal Plain, most of the town is only slightly above sea level and thus parts of Southport used to be susceptible to flooding. Marine Drive was regularly closed due to flooding from high tides, but in February 1997, new sea defences started being constructed and in 2002 the whole project was completed.

Southport has a maritime climate like most of the UK. Due to its position by the coast, Southport rarely sees substantial snowfall and temperatures rarely fall below −5 °C (23 °F) so it does not have frequent frosts. Southport generally has moderate precipitation, unlike the rest of western UK.

The coast-to-coast Trans Pennine Trail (TPT) stretches the breadth of northern England – 215 miles (346 km) from Southport in the west to Hornsea in the east. The TPT is a route for walkers, cyclists and horse riders linking the North and Irish seas and passing through the Pennines. It runs alongside rivers and canals and through some of the most historic towns and cities in the North of England.

== Demography ==
The United Kingdom Census 2001 showed a resident population for Southport of 90,336. Approximately 19,000 were aged 16 or under, 60,000 were aged 16–74, and 10,000 aged 75 and over. According to the 2001 census, 96% of Southport's population claim they have been born in the UK.

The population of Southport began to rapidly increase during the Industrial Revolution and the Victorian era. From then the population has been stable with minor decline in some areas of the town.

Population growth in Southport, 1901–2011

Year	Population	±%
1901	48,083	—
1911	51,643	+7.4%
1921	76,621	+48.4%

Year	Population	±%
1931	78,925	+3.0%
1939	91,240	+15.6%
1951	84,039	−7.9%

Year	Population	±%
1961	82,004	−2.4%
2001	91,400	+11.5%
2011	91,703	+0.3%

Source: Southport – A Vision of Britain, City Population – Southport &

== Economy ==
=== Tourism ===
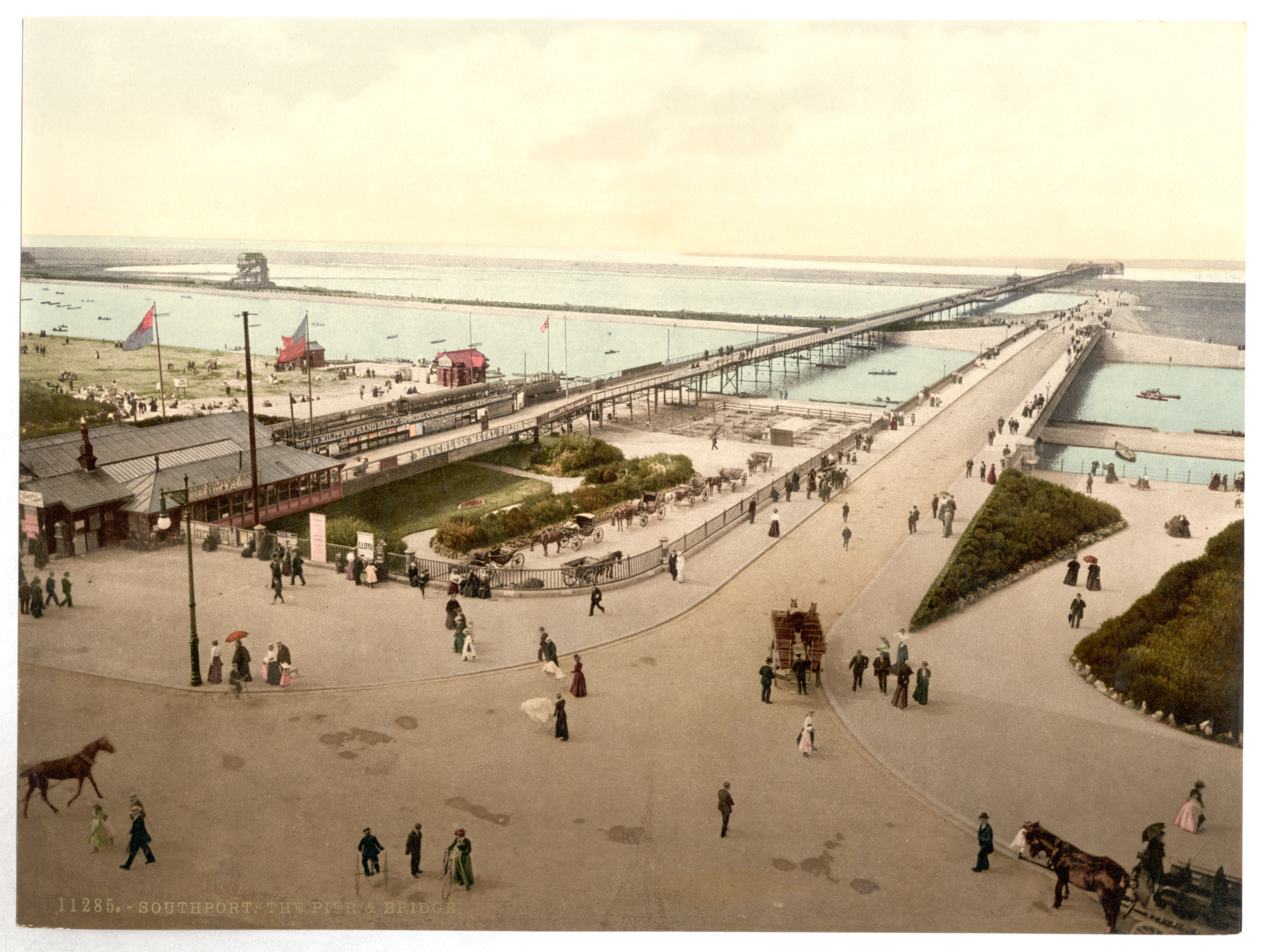
Southport pier, 1890s

As a seaside town Southport has a history of leisure and recreation and is still dependent on tourism. The town went into decline when cheap air travel arrived in the 1960s and people chose to holiday abroad due to competitive prices and more reliable weather. However, the town kept afloat with people coming to spend the day by the seaside on bank holidays and weekends. The town has diversified with annual events, shopping and conferences. In 2011, Southport was named the fourteenth-most popular coastal resort in the country, benefiting from a 23% rise in money spent in the resort in that year. Part of the resort's progress is a result of the money invested in Southport over recent years.

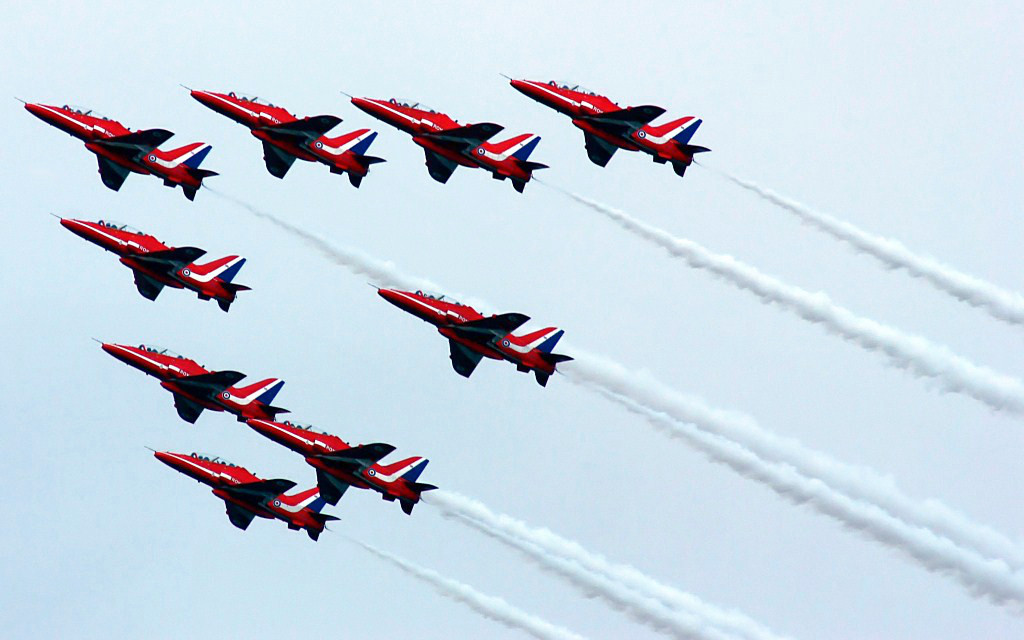
The Red Arrows at Southport Airshow in 2009

- Southport Airshow, the north west's biggest airshow, held in the summer
- Southport Flower Show
- British Musical Fireworks Championships
- Southport International Jazz Festival
- Southport Food and Drink Festival
- Southport Rocks
- Southport 24 Hour Race, A sailing race that sees boats racing continuously for 24 hours even in extreme weather conditions. Entries have included Olympic gold medallists and teams from the Republic of Ireland and France, and even the US and Australia. It is regarded as one of the hardest endurance races in the world.
- Tidy Boys IDEAL Weekender

=== Business ===
While Southport has a dependence on tourism the town is also home to businesses both in the private and public sector. Some manufacturing facilities were situated in the town, most notably Chewits were manufactured in the town from 1965 to 2006, only closing to move production to Slovakia. Manufacturing has diminished in the last few decades and only a few sites are still in production in the town today.

Lord Street is the main shopping street of Southport. It is one of the great shopping streets of Northern England and is said to be the inspiration for the tree-lined boulevards of Paris. In the 2000s Chapel Street was pedestrianised and is home to famous brands. Southport also has an indoor market situated on King Street and Market Street as well as a farmers' market held on the last Thursday of every month on Chapel Street.

Southport has hosted conferences since at least the 1880s when the Royal Institution met in the town. The former Southport Theatre & Convention Centre closed in 2020 and a planning permission application for a new Marine Lake Events Centre was submitted at the end of June 2022. It has hosted the United Kingdom Independence Party national conference as well as the regional Labour Party conference. The Liberal Democrats held their federal Spring conference here in March 2018.

=== England's Golf Coast ===
Southport is often called England's Golfing Capital because it is at the centre of England's Golf Coast. Royal Birkdale Golf Club is one of the clubs in the Open Championship rotation for both men and women. The club has hosted the men's championship ten times since 1954, most recently in July 2017, and has hosted the women's tournament five times, including 2010. Southport's other courses include the 9-hole Southport Old Links in High Park, the Hesketh Golf Club, Hillside Golf Club and Southport and Ainsdale Golf Club.

== Attractions ==
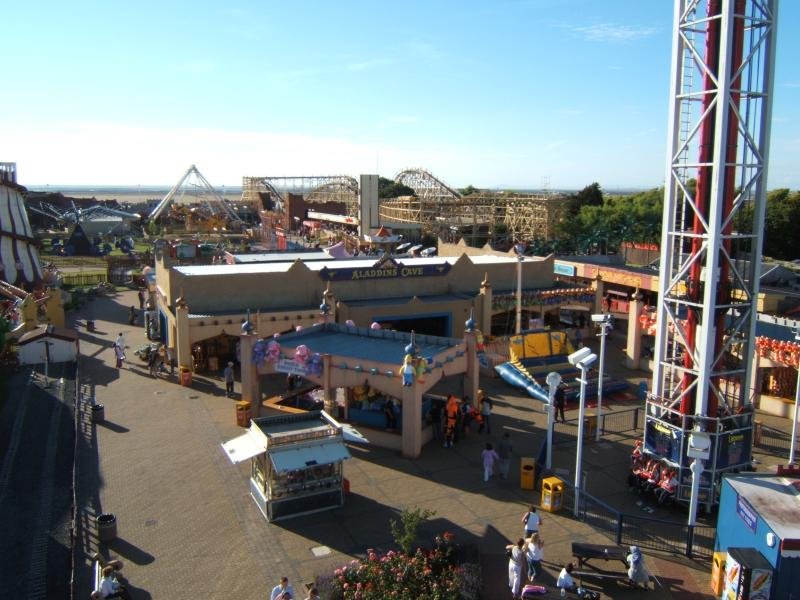
Pleasureland in 2005

One of Southport's main attractions for many years was Pleasureland, a fairground established in 1912. It was owned by the Thompson Family, and was closed in September 2006. A replacement fairground on the same site, provisionally named New Pleasureland, opened in July 2007. An earlier permanent funfair, Peter Pan's Playground, closed in the 1980s and is now the site of part of the Ocean Plaza shopping development.

A former landmark of Pleasureland was the Looping Star roller coaster, which was on site from 1985 to 1987. It featured in the video for the pop single Wonderful Life, by Liverpool band Black, which was also shot at other parts of the Sefton and North West coastline. On 24 April 2009 a serious fire occurred at the oldest attraction within New Pleasureland. Called The River Caves, it was completely destroyed in this arson attack, and a 16-year-old boy was arrested in connection with the fire.

Southport Model Railway Village is situated in Kings Gardens opposite the Royal Clifton Hotel and near the Marine Lake Bridge. The Model Railway Village opened in May 1996 and was created by Ray and Jean Jones. The Jones family still run the attraction today. The Model Railway Village season extends from April to the end of October. The season has extended into weekend openings during November, February and March, weather permitting. An earlier model village, the Land of the Little People, was demolished in the late 1980s to make way for the aborted Winter Gardens/SIBEC shopping development. Its site is now occupied by a Morrison's supermarket.

Other attractions in Southport include Splash World, an indoor water park situated on the back of the Dunes swimming pool which opened in June 2007. Meols Hall, a manor house, home of the Hesketh family, is open to the public for a limited period each year. Its history back to the Domesday Book. The British Lawnmower Museum is based in Shakespeare Street, a short distance outside the town centre. The Power Station, that was the base of the town's former radio station Dune FM, on the edge of Victoria Park, which itself is home to the Southport Flower Show.

The Twelfth of July parade in Southport is a major annual event for within the Orange Order, drawing lodges and members from across England and beyond. Held to commemorate the Battle of the Boyne, it is organized by the Liverpool Provincial Grand Orange Lodge. The event is one of the largest and most visible Orange Order parades outside of Northern Ireland. The procession, which includes marching bands, banners, and ceremonial attire, moves through the town center, attracting crowds of spectators. The parade route typically passes through prominent streets before ending in a park for a day of celebration and activities. The event has a long history in Merseyside, starting in 1819.

=== Architecture ===
See also Listed buildings in Southport

Southport has many unique buildings and features, many of which are privately owned Victorian villas and houses and the town centre shops are of architectural interest. The most notable buildings, gardens and places of architectural interest are:

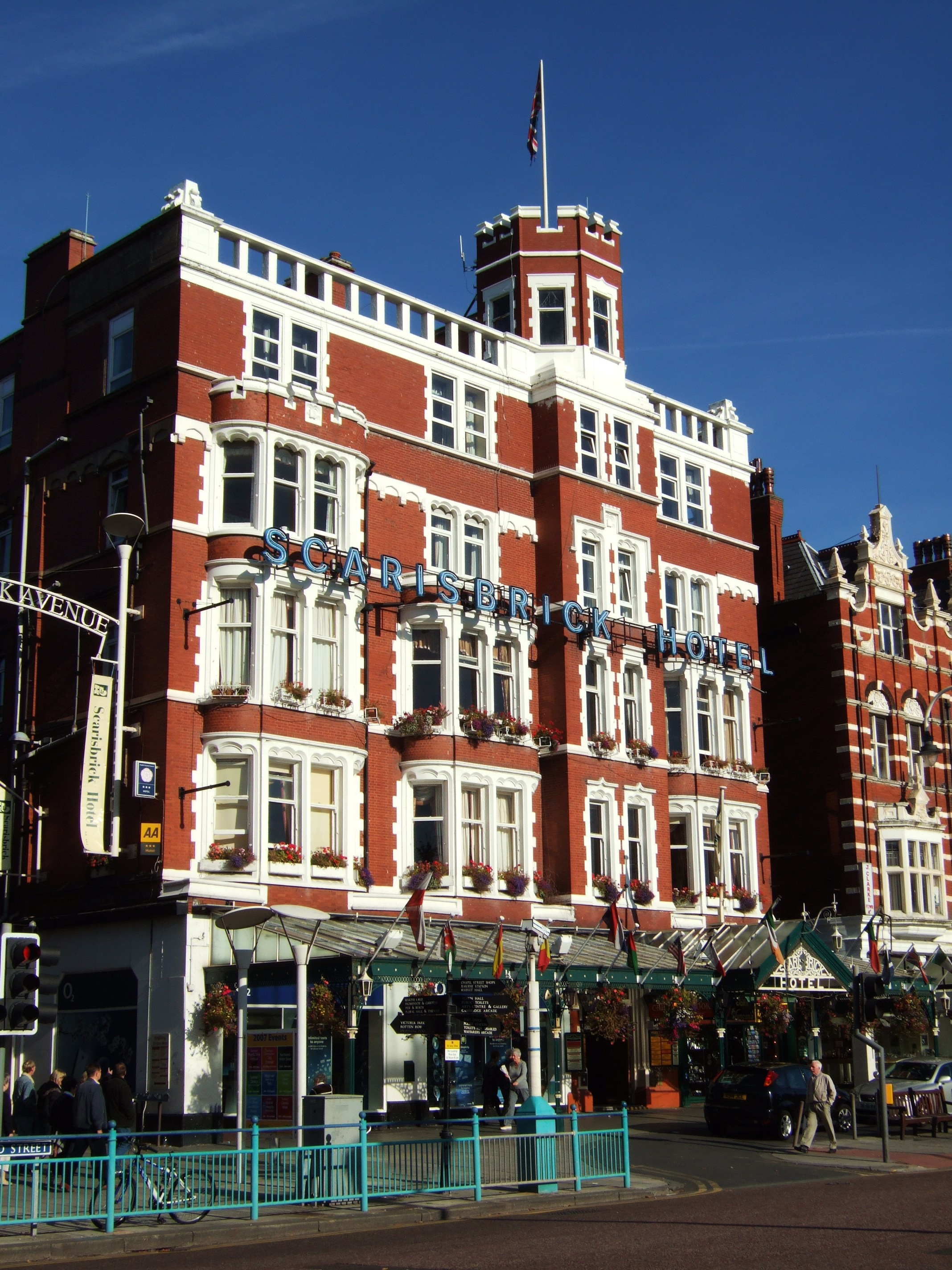
Scarisbrick Hotel on Lord Street

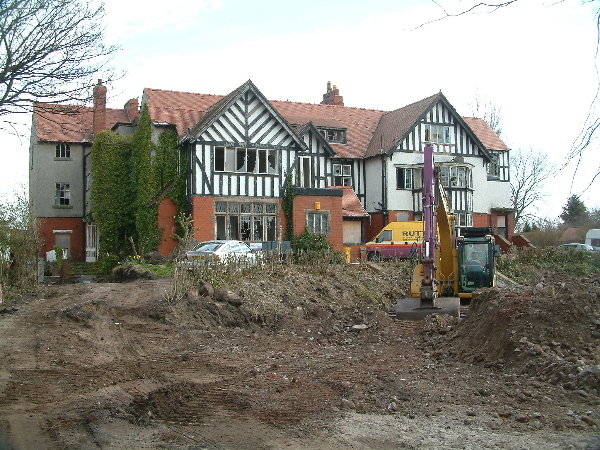
Rosefield Hall, one of Southport's Victorian mansions, while being restored in 2007

- Lakeside Miniature Railway
- Southport Pier, formerly home of the Southport Pier Tramway
- Marine Way Bridge
- Lord Street
- Southport Model Railway Village
- Promenade Hospital, renovated as luxury flats and renamed Marine Gate Mansions
- Ribble Building, built as a railway station then adapted for use as a bus station, part of the site was redeveloped as a supermarket and the remainder converted to a hotel and 24hr gym
- Smedley Hydro A former Victorian Hydropathic Health Spa, now under ownership of the Home Office for the UK's Birth, Deaths and Marriages
- Botanic Gardens
- Hesketh Park
- Park Crescent, Hesketh Park No.29 has one of the oldest existing residential garages in the UK dating from about 1899, although both house and garage have been converted to flats.
- Rosefield Hall on Hesketh Road, built 1908, former home of Maurice de Forest and used as a hospital during World War II
- Meols Hall
- Round House
- Wayfarers Arcade
- The Atkinson
- St Cuthbert's Church
- St George's United Reformed Church, Lord Street

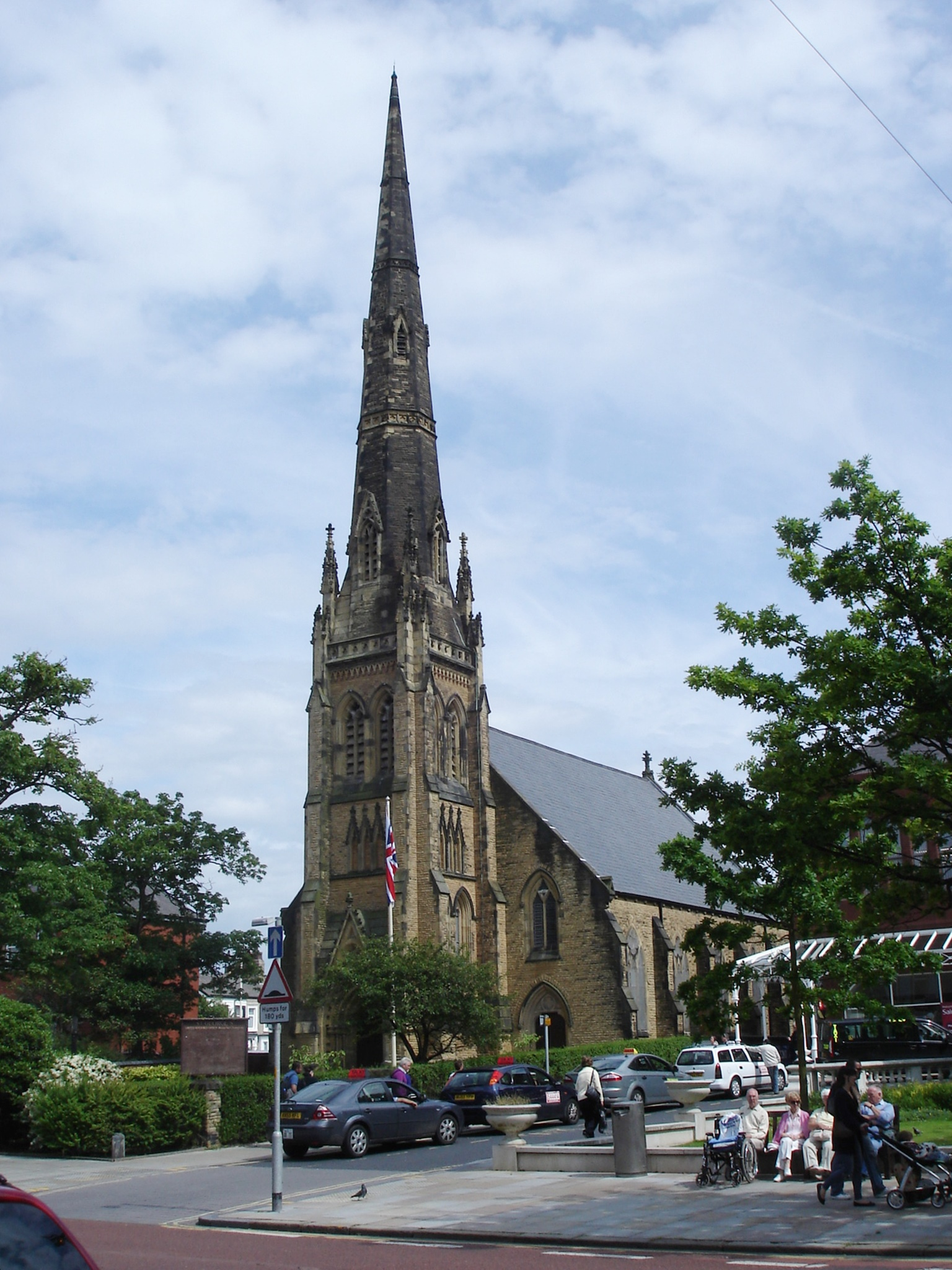
St George's United Reformed Church, Lord St

- Emmanuel Parish Church, Cambridge Road, which has an organ, installed in 1914, built by Harrisons of Durham
- Holy Trinity Church, founded before 1898
- Queen Victoria Statue – originally moved from the Town Hall Gardens to Nevill Street junction to the Promenade and again to the pedestrianised side of Nevill Street.
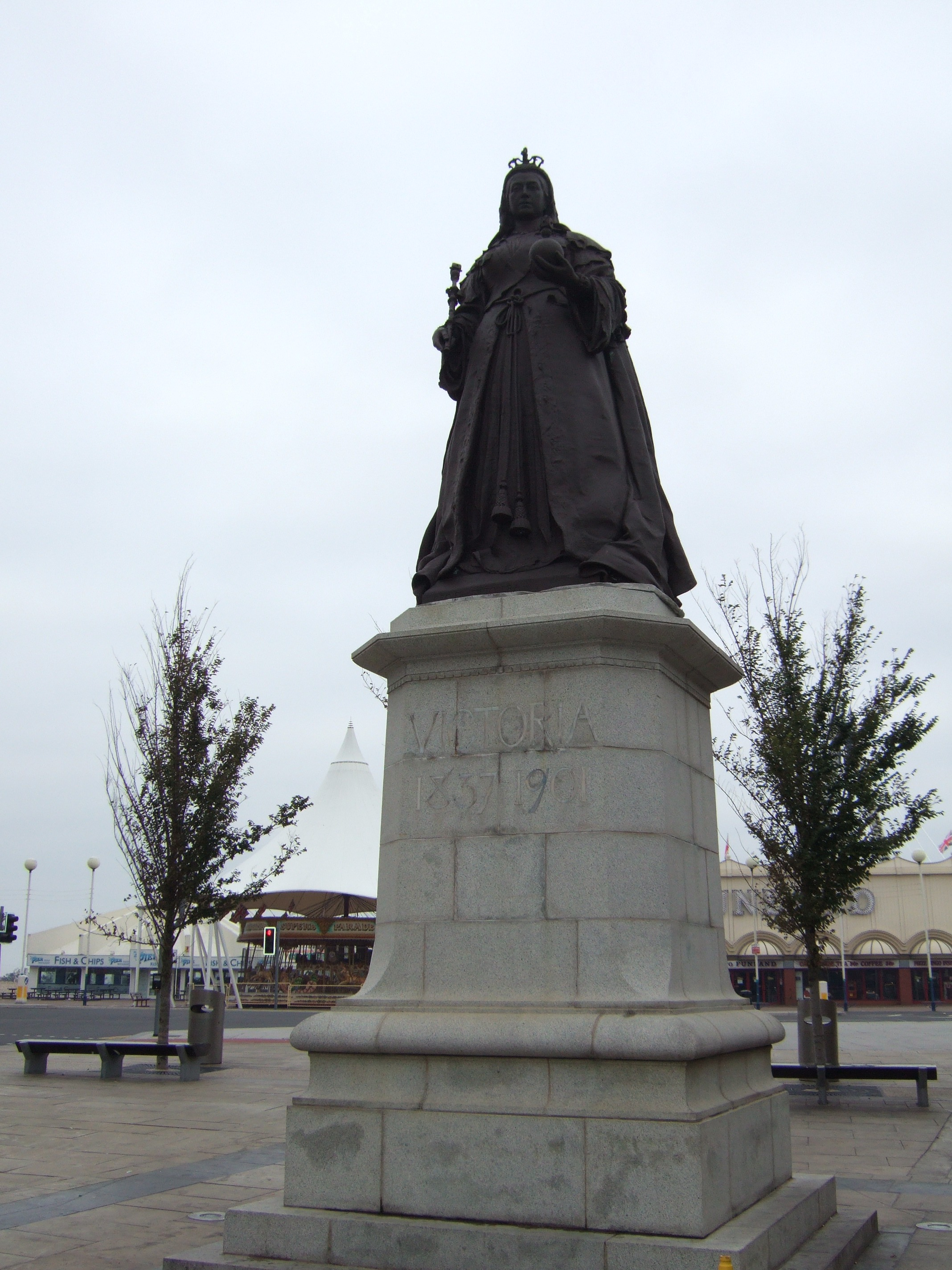
  Statue of Queen Victoria on Nevill Street
- Garrick Theatre, a former theatre, cinema and bingo hall, built in 1932 in Art Deco style

Also of architectural interest, but not existing, are:

- Kingsway Night Club – demolished in 2010 following an arson attack
- Steamport Museum (housed inside the former 27C locomotive shed, demolished in late 2000) – site now occupied by Central 12 shopping complex)
- Palace Hotel, Birkdale (a large Victorian hotel – demolished in 1969
- Southport General Infirmary – demolished in 2008–09 with only a wing of the infirmary remaining as it is being used for mental health services

== Transport ==
=== Road ===
Southport is the second-largest town in Britain with no direct dual-carriageway link to the national motorway network (after Eastbourne: 2011 census). Due to its position by the coast, Southport is a linear settlement and as such can only be approached in a limited number of directions by road.

The main roads entering Southport are:

- A565 (from Preston to the northeast, from the A59 Liverpool – Preston – York)
- A570 (from Ormskirk and St Helens to the southeast)
- A565 (from Liverpool and Formby to the south)

The nearest motorway connections are:

- from the southeast – junction 3 of the M58 (via the A570, twelve miles)
- from the south – junction 7 of the M57 (via the A565, fourteen miles)
- from the northeast – junction 1 of the M65 / junction 29 of the M6 (via the A59 and A582, nineteen miles)

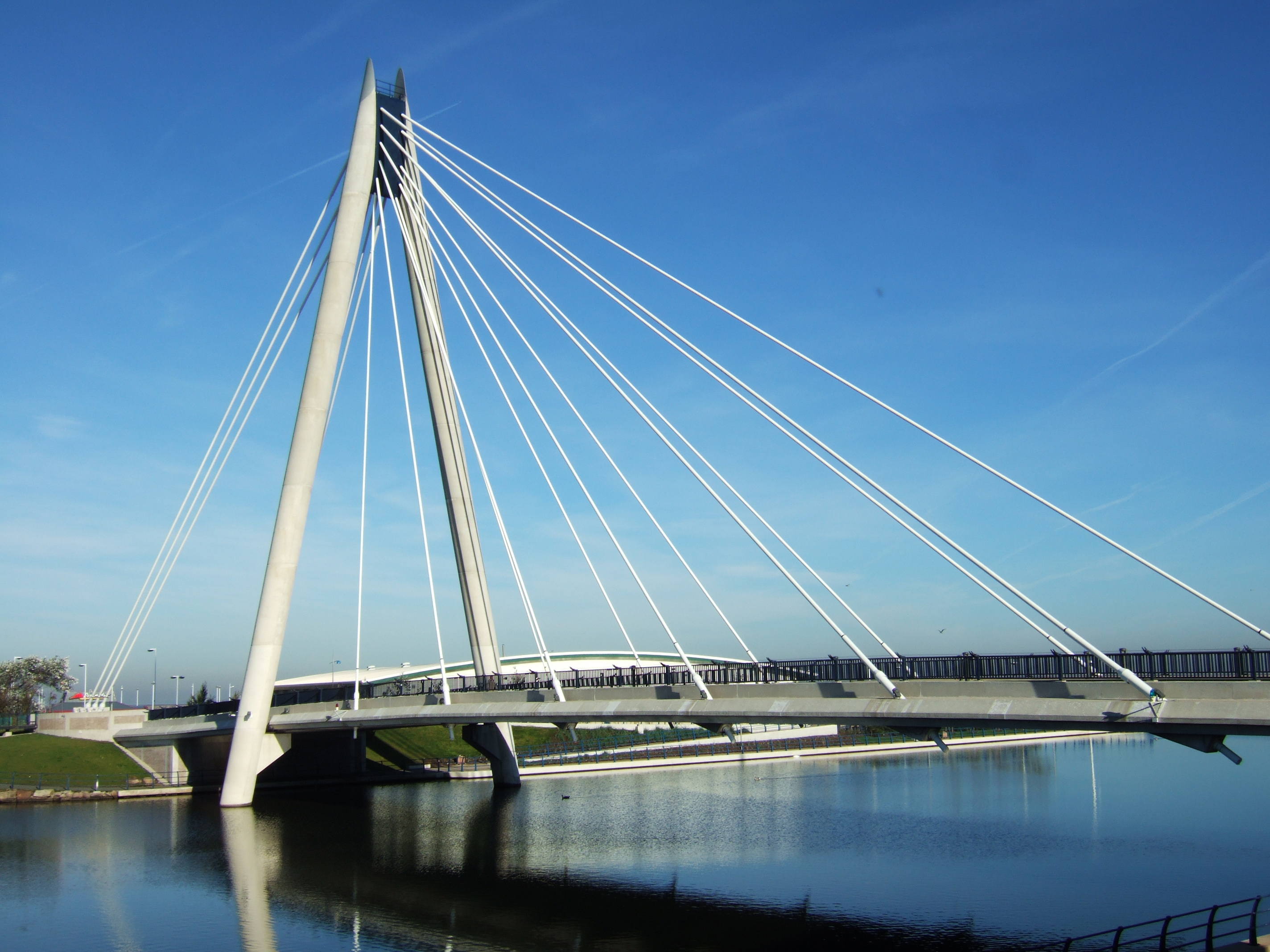
Marine Way Bridge

An east-west bypass for the A570 at Ormskirk is planned to relieve congestion on Southport's main access route to the motorway network, although the effectiveness of the proposals are still under debate.

Several areas within Southport town centre have undergone major road redevelopment; the largest scheme was the construction of the Marine Way Bridge (opened May 2004), which connects the Lord Street shopping district with the new seafront developments. The 150-foot (46 m) high structure is thought to have cost in the region of £5 million.

Also one of the main shopping areas in the town, Chapel Street, has undergone a pedestrianisation scheme to be similar to parts of Liverpool city centre.

=== Bus ===
Due to the limited number of directions by road, many of the services operated in Southport are from one place south to one place north or east of Southport.

The main operator is Arriva North West, that operates two (previously four) services to Liverpool, and two to Wigan and Skelmersdale via Ormskirk, Scarisbrick and Pinfold/Burscough. Arriva also operate two regular, local services which are the 49 & the 44 as well as a twice a day variation of service 46 (46B), six circular services around Formby, and used to operate one seasonal service (serving Pontins to the south of the town).

Stagecoach Cumbria and North Lancashire (Preston Depot) operates services to Liverpool or Preston on the X2(both ways) or the 2(Southport to Preston only).

Vison Bus run a route to Chorley via Rufford (347).

Cumfybus runs local services around the town and some school services.

Maghull Coaches run some private school runs around the area.

Merseytravel Metro (Stagecoach) runs services to St Helens via Ormsmirk on the 37A

=== Rail ===
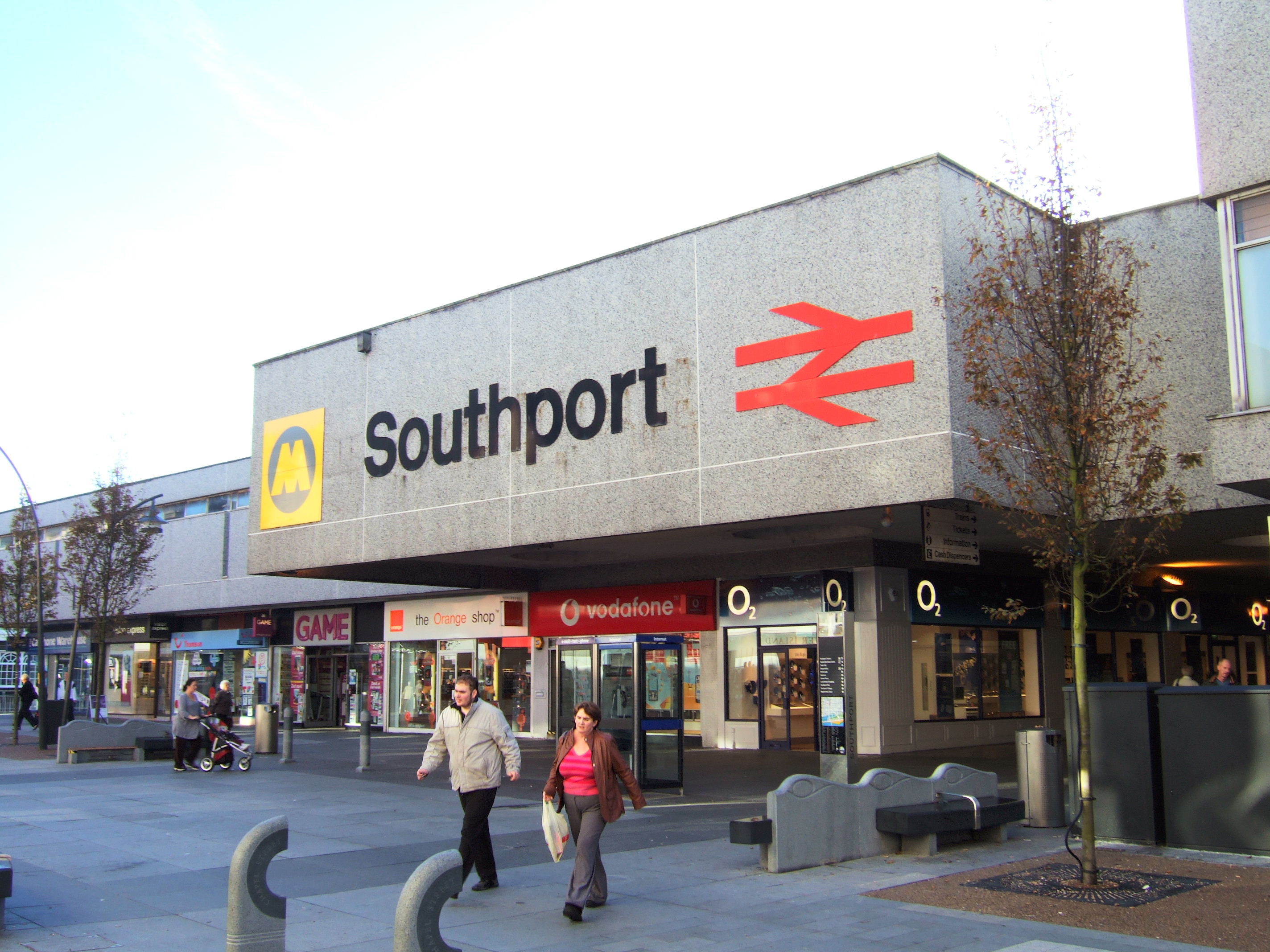
Southport railway station

Railway station
Site of former railway station
Railway station
Site of former railway station

Southport railway station has a frequent service of trains to Liverpool, operated by Merseyrail and a regular service to Wigan, Bolton, Manchester and Leeds. In addition, there are stations at Birkdale, Hillside and Ainsdale on the Liverpool line, part of the Merseyrail network, and at Meols Cop on the Manchester line.

The Liverpool line was originally built by the Liverpool, Crosby and Southport Railway in 1848, to a temporary terminus at Eastbank Street, this line was extended to Chapel Street in 1851. It was followed on 9 April 1855 by the Lancashire and Yorkshire Railway and East Lancashire Railway (who had jointly taken over the Manchester and Southport Railway before it became operational) with a line from Wigan Wallgate to a terminus at London Street, with later stations at St Luke's and Blowick. Chapel Street and London Street were adjacent and all operations were transferred to Chapel Street in 1857.

Formerly, Southport was served by three further railway lines:

- From 1882, the West Lancashire Railway operated from Southport Derby Road station (also known as Southport Central) to Preston Fishergate Hill. It had stations in Southport at Ash Street, St Luke's, Hesketh Park, Churchtown and Crossens. This line was shut in 1964, and nowadays, Southport and Preston are linked only by the (largely dual-carriageway) A565 and A59 roads.
- In 1884, another line from Southport to Liverpool was opened: the Cheshire Lines Committee's Southport & Cheshire Lines Extension Railway extended the CLC's North Liverpool Extension Line from Liverpool Central to Southport Lord Street. It had stations in Southport at Birkdale Palace and Ainsdale Beach.
- The West Lancashire Railway sponsored the Liverpool, Southport and Preston Junction Railway to provide a connection to the CLC line, joining it at Altcar and Hillhouse. It had stations in Southport at Butts Lane and Kew Gardens. These lines ultimately proved uncompetitive, and the Southport services were withdrawn in 1952.

In July 1897, both the West Lancashire and the Liverpool, Southport and Preston Junction Railways were absorbed into the Lancashire and Yorkshire Railway (L&Y). The L&Y had a large terminus at Southport Chapel Street and could see no sense in operating two termini at very close proximity. In 1901, the L&Y completed a remodelling of the approach lines to Central to allow trains to divert onto the Manchester to Southport line and into Southport Chapel Street Station. Southport Central was closed to passengers and it became a goods depot eventually amalgamating with Chapel Street depot. It survived intact well into the 1970s.

On Southport Pier can be found the now closed Southport Pier Tramway which used to transport passengers from the Promenade to the pier head over 3,600 feet (1,100 m) on a 3 ft 6 in (1,067 mm) gauge. This closed in 2016 because of the effect on the pier of the weight of the trams.

The Lakeside Miniature Railway passes under the pier, carrying passengers along the western side of the marine lake. The line claims to be the oldest continuously running 15 in (381 mm) gauge railway in the world.

== Education ==
There are several schools in the town. The all-girls Greenbank High School is situated next to the Royal Birkdale Golf Club, and is a certified Specialist Language school. Actress Miranda Richardson was educated at the school. Its brother school is the all-boys Birkdale High School, which specialises in mathematics.

There are several other high schools in the town, including Meols Cop High School, Stanley High School, which is a specialist sports school (whose former students include comedian Lee Mack and chef Marcus Wareing), and Christ the King High School.

=== Independent schools ===
The town's last remaining independent preparatory school, Sunnymede School, which was in Westcliffe Road, Birkdale closed in 2010 due to a lack of pupils. In the past the town had more independent schools which included Tower Dene, Brighthelmston School (girls) and University School (boys). Kingswood College (originally St Wyburn's) is now housed outside Southport at Scarisbrick Hall.

=== Further education ===
The town has two further education colleges: Southport College, situated near to the town centre, and King George V College (KGV), located on Scarisbrick New Road in the Blowick area of the town.

Courses at Southport College include Diplomas, NVQs, BTECs and Access courses. In addition, Southport College offers some higher education courses in conjunction with the University of Central Lancashire, Edge Hill University and Liverpool John Moores University.

King George V College offers both A-Level and Business And Technology Education Council (BTEC). It opened as King George V Sixth Form College in 1979, and replaced the former King George V Grammar School for Boys, which occupied the same site from 1926 until its demolition in stages during the 1980s as the college was fully opened. In 2013, the college was the best performing state-funded college in an 18-mile radius of KGV. However, by 2015 Ofsted reported that it 'Requires improvement'. In 2016, Ofsted again rated it poorly, and a government report suggesting merging it with nearby Southport College.

== Media ==
=== Newspapers ===
The independently owned Champion newspaper was a free weekly paper that ceased publishing in August 2022, while The Mid-week Visiter and The Southport Visiter (part of Reach plc's Sefton & West Lancs Media Mix titles) are free and paid-for newspapers respectively. The town also falls within the circulation areas of three regional hard copy newspapers; The Liverpool Echo, The Liverpool Daily Post and The Lancashire Evening Post. Southport is also covered by several local and regional magazines, like Lancashire Life. The local Ranger Service, which is part of Sefton MBC, runs a quarterly free magazine called Coastlines.

Old Southport newspapers now out of print are as follows: Independent 1861–1920s; Liverpool & Southport News 1861–1872; Southport News (West Lancs) 1881–1885; Southport Standard 1885–1899; Southport Guardian 1882–1953; Southport Journal 1904–1932; Southport Star; and Southport Advertiser.

The area also has online media sites, including the UK's first online newspaper, the Southport Reporter, as well as Internet forums and blog sites.

=== Broadcasting ===
The town's commercial radio station Dune FM closed during August 2012. Coast 107.9 was since launched and continued to broadcast online. Southport is covered by several local and regional radio stations, including Dune Radio, Hits Radio Liverpool (formerly Radio City), Hits Radio Lancashire (formerly Rock FM), Greatest Hits Radio Liverpool & The North West, Greatest Hits Radio Lancashire, BBC Radio Merseyside and BBC Radio Lancashire.

Mighty Radio is Southport's only local community FM radio station broadcasting on 107.9 MHz FM and online. It was established in 2012, after the towns former station closed. Mighty Radio was given a trial restricted service licence in 2012. In December 2018, OFCOM awarded Mighty Radio with their FM licence. Showcasing local talent through their presenters, they provide the town with local news from Radio News Hub hourly from 07:00 to 19:00 seven days a week with local headlines. The station supports local and national charities.

Southport is situated within the television regions of BBC North West and ITV's Granada Television.

== Sports ==
=== Football ===
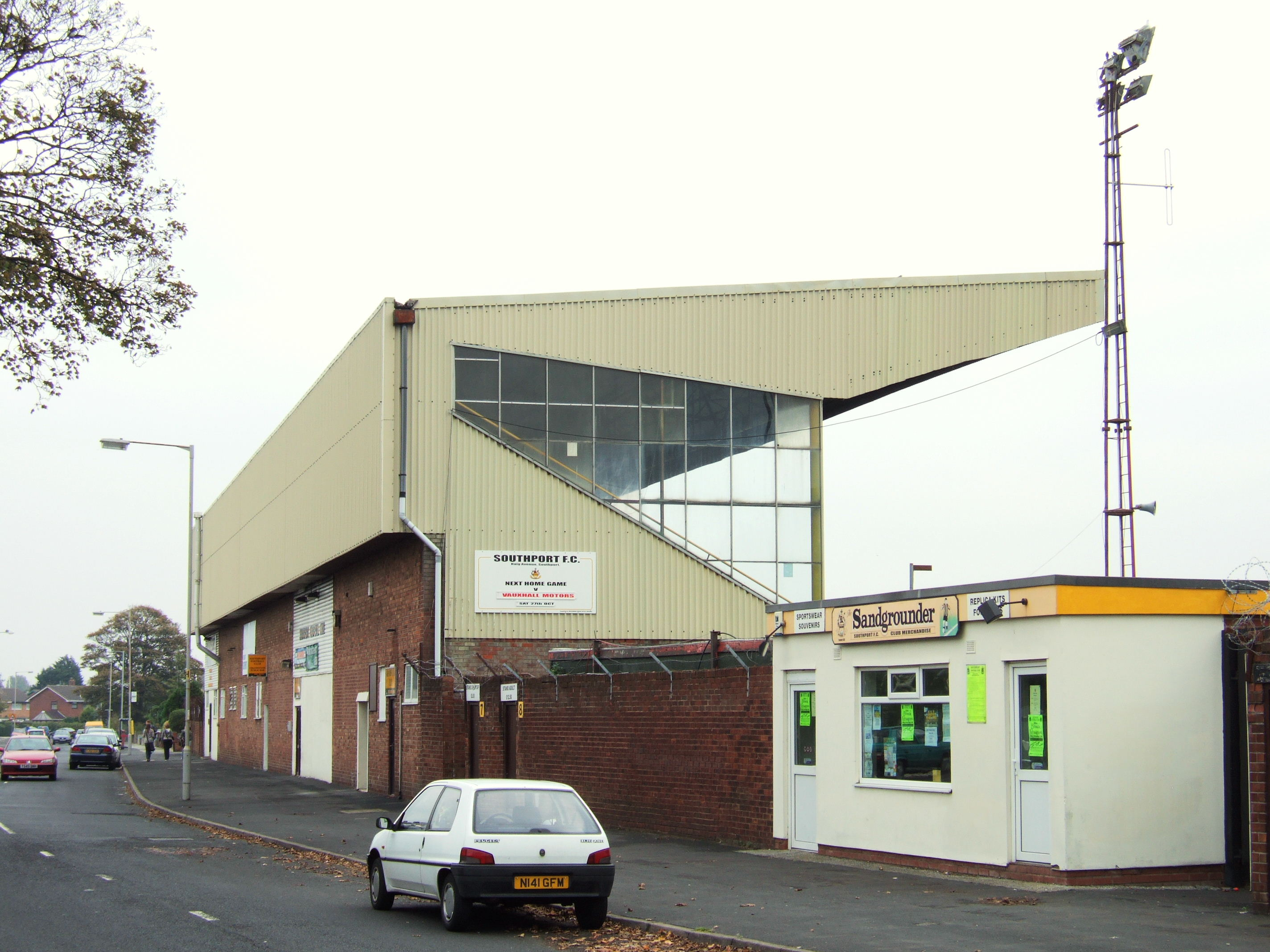
Haig Avenue, home of Southport F.C.

Southport is home to Southport F.C. who have played at the Haig Avenue, Blowick ground since 1905. The club entered The Football League in 1921 and became a founder member of the Third Division North. In 1978 the club was voted out of the Football League following three consecutive 23rd (out of 24) placed finishes, and was replaced by Wigan Athletic. Southport were the last club to leave the Football League through the re-election process. Automatic relegation from the Fourth Division was introduced in 1986–1987. They are in the National League North, the sixth tier of English football. They were previously in the National League after winning the Conference North in 2009–2010 campaign.

=== Rugby ===
Southport is home to a rugby union club, Southport Rugby Football Club, who play their home matches at Waterloo Road in Hillside. Southport RFC's first XV plays in North 2 West in the Rugby Football Union Northern Division, and the club fields sides at all age levels, Senior: First XV, Second XV, Third XV, veterans, Ladies, U18 Colts; Junior: U13s to U17 Colts; Mini: U6s to U12s.

Founded as Southport Football Club on 29 November 1872, it is one of the oldest rugby clubs in the world. The first president of the club was Samuel Swire, the Mayor of Southport. In line with the origins of the modern game, the club was composed of old public school boys, and was formed with the intention of improving the physical development of our young townsmen. The driving force behind the formation of the club was Dr George Coombe (later Sir George Augustus Pilkington) of Southport Infirmary. Notable former players include, Samuel Perry, England International, Gordon Rimmer, former England International, and British Lion and *Bob Burdell, Wigan Warriors and Lancashire.

=== Golf ===
The Royal Birkdale Golf Club situated in the dunes to the south of the town is one of the venues on The Open Championship rotation and has hosted two Ryder Cups. Nearby Southport and Ainsdale Golf Club is also a two time Ryder Cup venue and both Hillside Golf Club and Hesketh Golf Club host major events as well as being final open qualifying courses. Smaller links courses also surround the town.

=== Tennis ===
Southport hosted the North of England Hard Court Championships on clay for both men and women players at the Southport Argyle Lawn Tennis Club from 1956 to 1988. Notable men's champions included Robert Bédard, Alan Mills, Tony Pickard, Billy Knight, and Mark Cox as runnerup in 1964. Women's champions included Angela Buxton, who won twice, Shirley Bloomer, who won five times, Rita Bentley, and Evonne Goolagong.

The Victoria Park clay courts held the Southport Dunlop Cup professional tournament from 1934 to 1939, winners including Bill Tilden in 1934, Ellsworth Vines in 1935, and Hans Nüsslein from 1936 to 1939.

=== Kite surfing ===
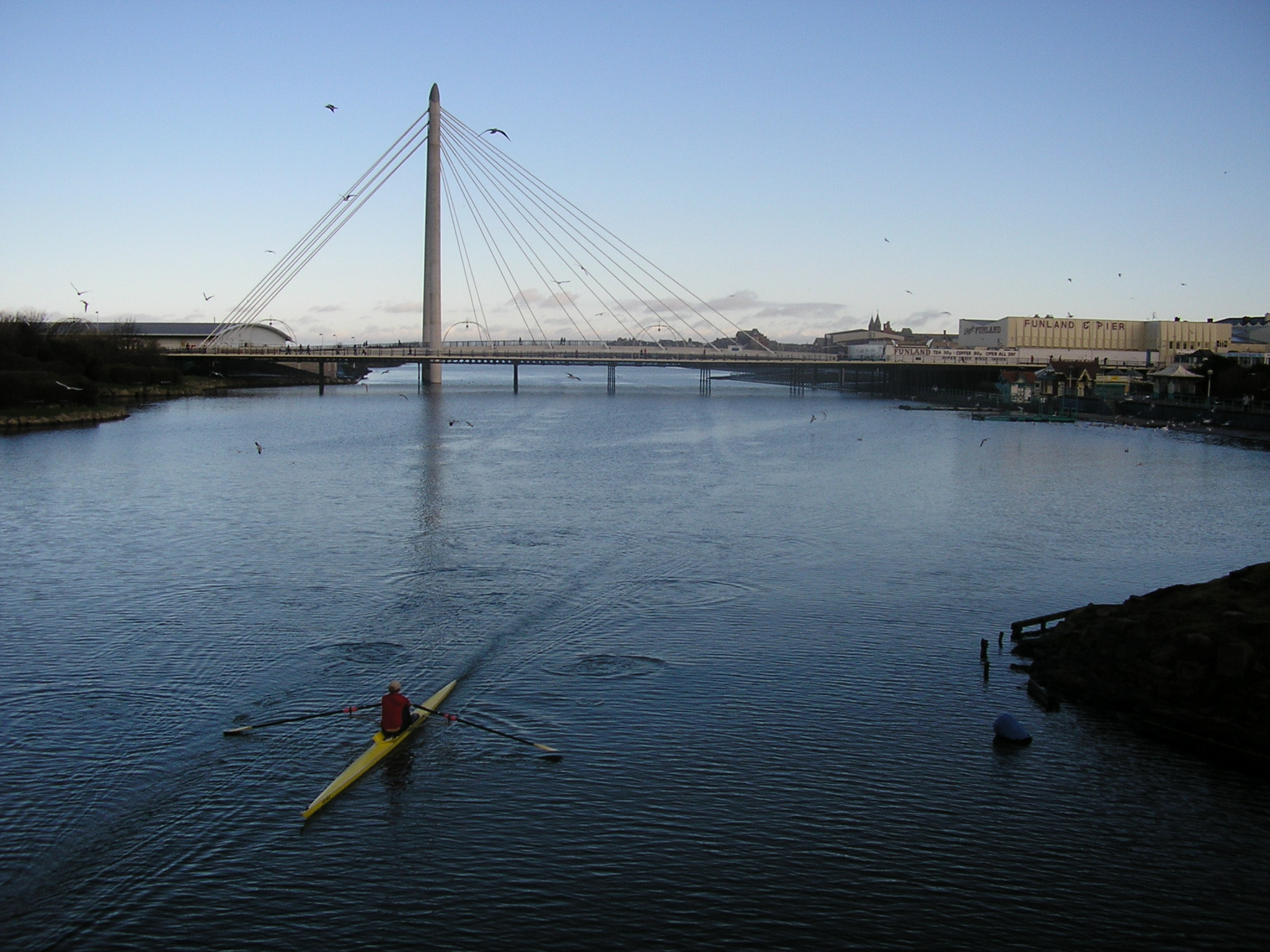
Sculler on Marine Lake

Ainsdale Beach, south of the town, is popular for kite sports, including kite-surfing.

=== Speed record ===
In 1925, Henry Segrave set a world land speed record of 152.33 mph (245.15 km/h) on the beach, driving a Sunbeam Tiger. His association is commemorated by the name of a public house on Lord Street.

=== Water ===
Marine Lake lies nestled between the town centre and the sea and is used for water-sports including water-skiing, sailing and rowing. The lake is home to the West Lancashire Yacht Club and Southport Sailing Club, both of which organise dinghy racing. The annual Southport 24 Hour Race, organised by the West Lancashire Yacht Club, is an endurance race of national standing, with an average turnout of 60 to 80 boats. In 2006, the event marked its 40th anniversary.

=== Cycling ===
The flat and scenic route alongside the beach is popular with cyclists, and is the start of the Trans Pennine Trail, a cycle route running across the north of the country to Selby in North Yorkshire, through Hull and on to Hornsea on the east coast.

In June 2008, Cycling England announced Southport as one of the 11 new cycling towns, which shared £47 million from the government to be spent solely on cycling schemes in the towns. Southport's Cycling Towns programme aims to encourage tourism and leisure cycling, create regeneration opportunities and significantly increase cycling to school. There are now many cycle lanes in Southport and more are planned, to encourage cycling in the town.

=== Speedway Racing ===
An article in the Northern Daily Telegraph for 22 September 1929 reports that a proposed meeting at Kew Speedway had been halted due to the intervention of the Auto Cycle Union. (ACU) The proprietor of the venture was Mr Farrar. It is not known if the track was amended and if any events took place.

== Notable people ==
- Marc Almond, singer and songwriter, founding member of Soft Cell.
- Bruce Anderson (1905–1979), baritone opera singer and actor, SABC English language radio service reporter in East and North Africa during World War 2.
- Mae Bamber, mayor of Southport
- Richard Corbett, MEP for Merseyside West (1996–1999) and Yorkshire and the Humber (1999–2009 and 2014–2020), born in Southport 1955
- Ronnie Fearn, Baron Fearn (1931–2022), politician, MP for Southport, and Peer.
- Tommy Fleetwood, professional golfer
- Låpsley, singer and songwriter
- Lee Mack, comedian and actor
- Keith Pring, footballer for Southport FC from 1969–1971
- Jackie Rimmer, footballer, played for Southport FC.
- Michael Rimmer, 800-metre athlete
- Stuart Rimmer, footballer
- William Rimmer, composer and conductor
- Tony Rodwell, footballer
- G. B. Samuelson, pioneer of British cinema
- Shaun Teale, footballer for Southport FC
- Marcus Wareing, celebrity chef

== Famous animals and entities ==
- Red Rum, record-breaking racehorse and three-time winner of the Aintree Grand National
- Eagle, a comic for boys, started in Southport
- Gomez, indie rock band originating from Southport
- Ron Asheton, founder member of The Stooges. Decided on a music career after visiting The Cavern Club during a stay in Southport.

== See also ==
- Corgi Motorcycle Co Ltd.
- Southport (UK Parliament constituency)
- Southport Corporation Tramways
- Southport power station
