= Southport Airshow =

Annual event held in Southport, Merseyside, England

Southport Air Show
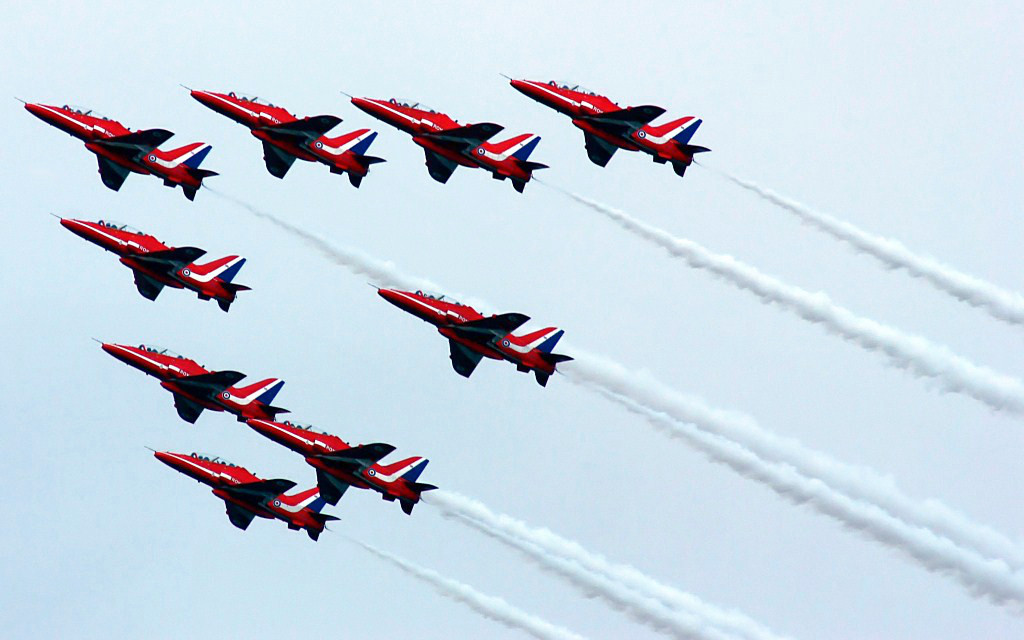
- The Red Arrows at Southport Air Show, 2009
- Status: Active
- Genre: Air show
- Dates: Summer/Autumn
- Locations: Southport, Merseyside
- Coordinates: 53.653°N 3.011°W
- Country: U.K.
- Established: 1991
- Previous event: 30-31 August 2025
- Next event: 29-30 August 2026
- Website: https://www.visitsouthport.com/whats-on/southport-air-show-p139433

Southport Air Show is an annual event held in Southport, Merseyside, England, since 1991. The first show was the brainchild of Tourism & Attractions employee, Mark Brammar.

The show takes place over two days, at the end of Summer, and attracts tens of thousands of spectators to see the many aircraft take to the skies above Southport and the displays that are held on Southport beach, making it the North West's largest Air Show.

The flying programme includes military and civilian aircraft, classic jets, helicopters, aerobatics by the world famous Red Arrows, warbirds and parachute displays. The Southport Model Aero Club usually put on a model aircraft display before the start of the main air display.

The show includes trade stands, interactive and educational displays, simulators and children's activities, as well as a military display with the highlight of a dramatic simulated battle on the beach involving army reserve forces complete with explosions and military vehicles. However, in 2007, the army units were unable to attend the event, due to operational commitments in Iraq.

In 2009, a Eurofighter Typhoon made an appearance at the show.

The 2010 Southport Airshow went ahead on Saturday 18 September with a display from the Red Arrows. The Sunday performances were cancelled due to poor weather, and heavy rain which caused flooding on the site.

In 2011, the show included the Battle of Britain Memorial Flight.

In 2015, the show on the Saturday saw the final ever appearance of Vulcan XH558 at the airshow. The appearance of Vulcan XH558 also included a very late addition to the display line-up, with another last-ever formation of the Vulcan escorted by the Red Arrows Display Team.

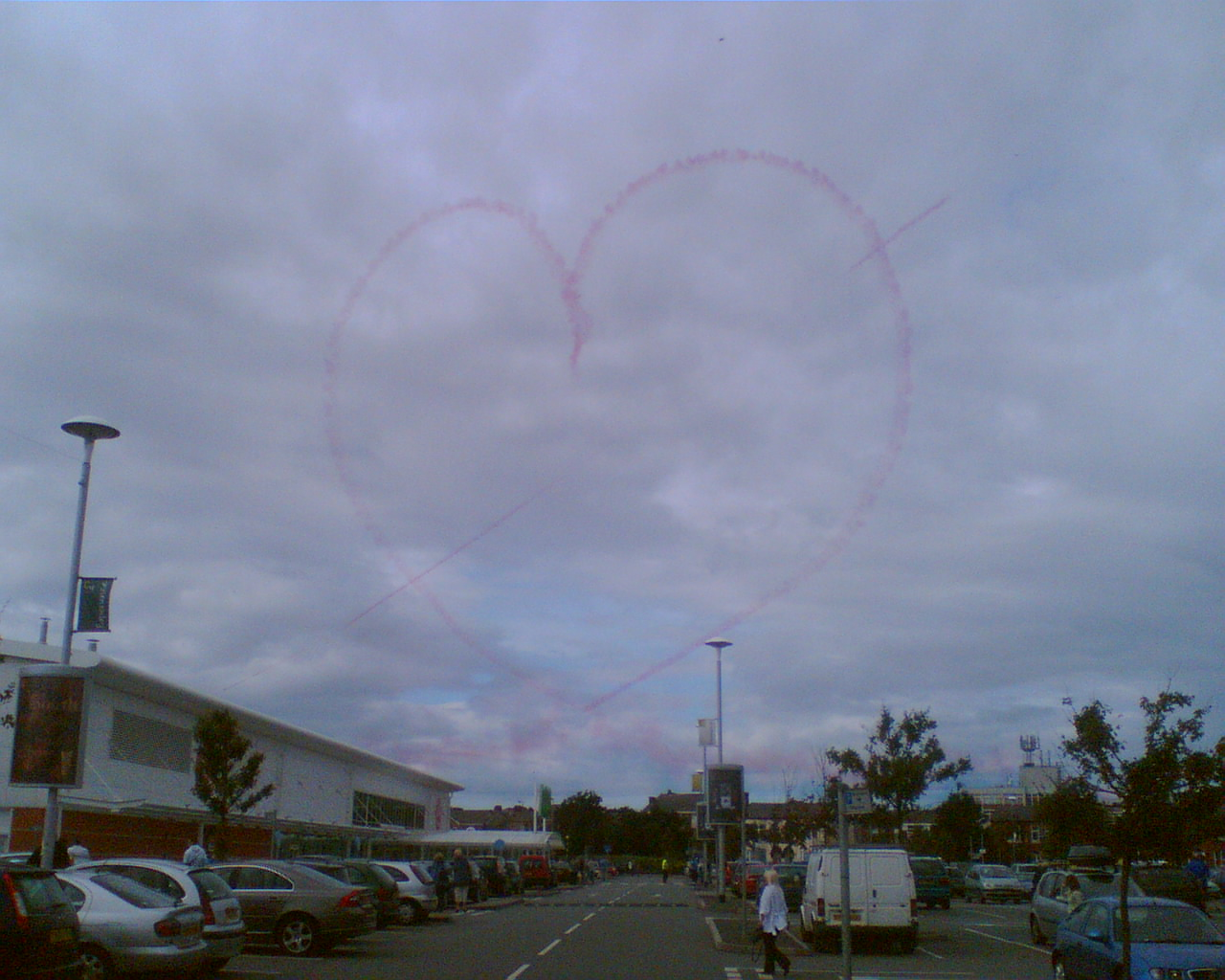
Southport Airshow Heart 2008

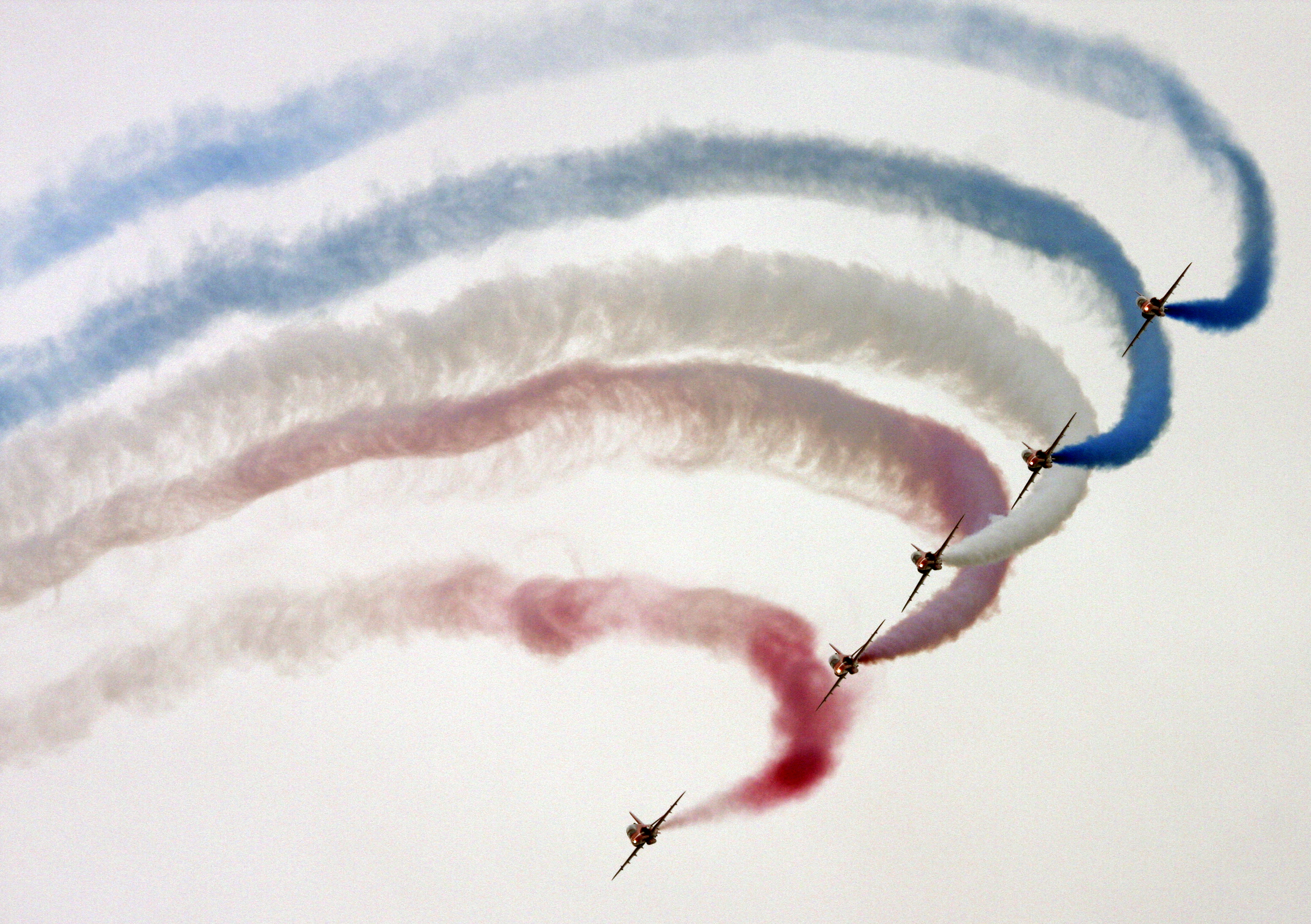
Red Arrows at Southport Airshow 2009

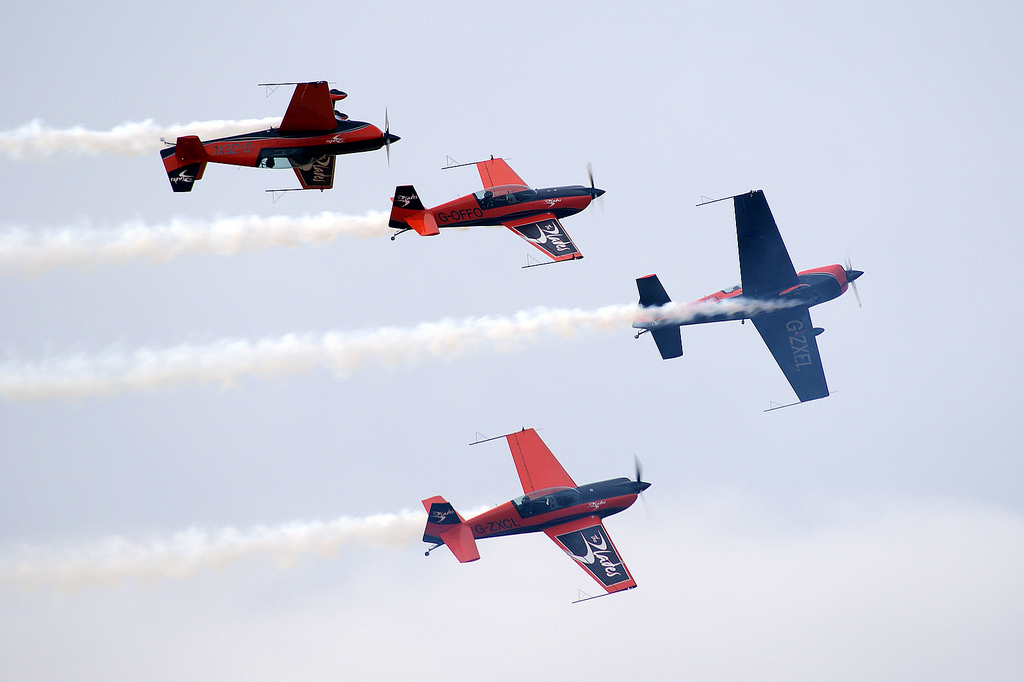
The Blades at Southport Airshow 2009

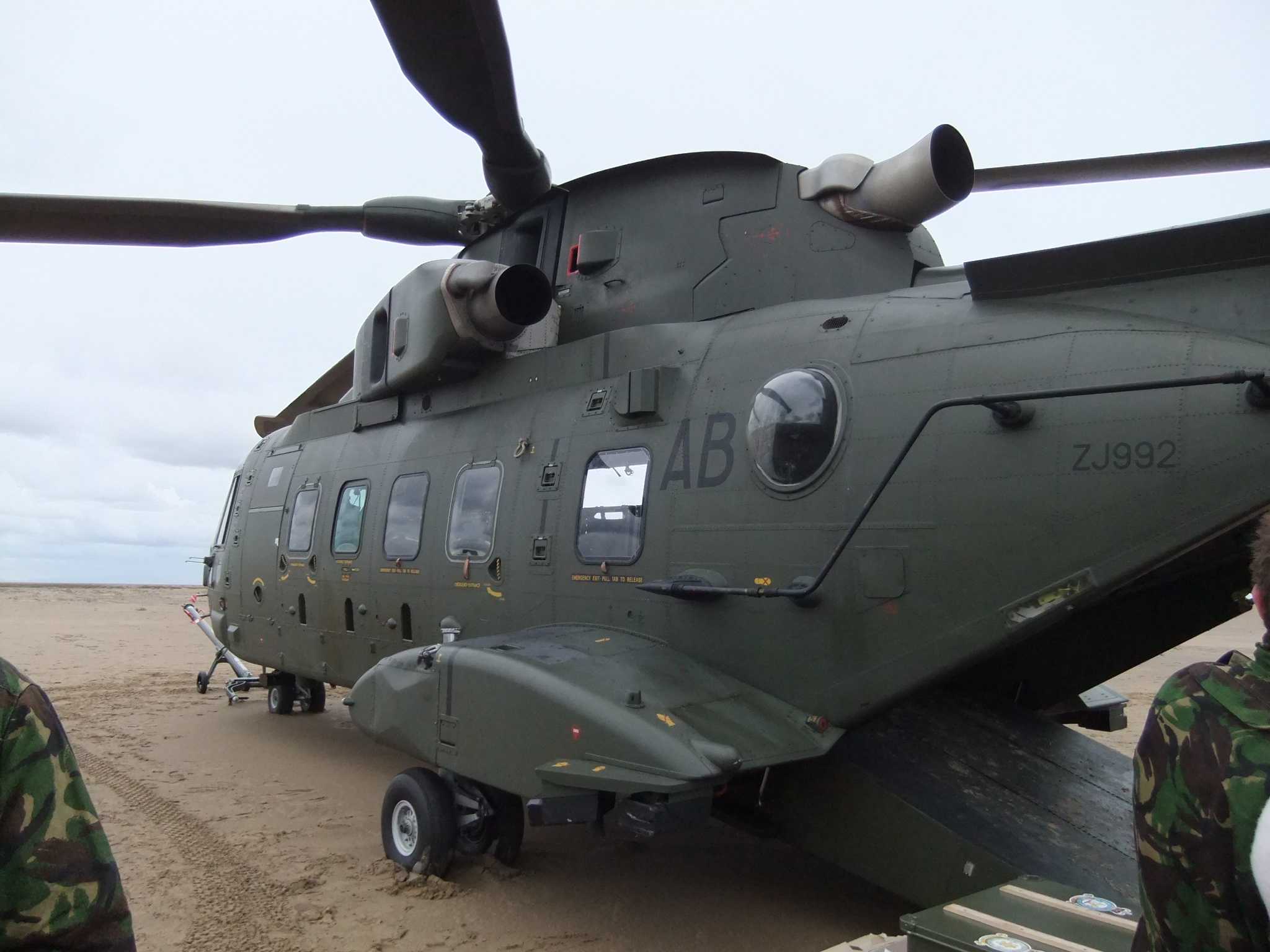
Merlin helicopter, Southport Airshow, 18 September 2010

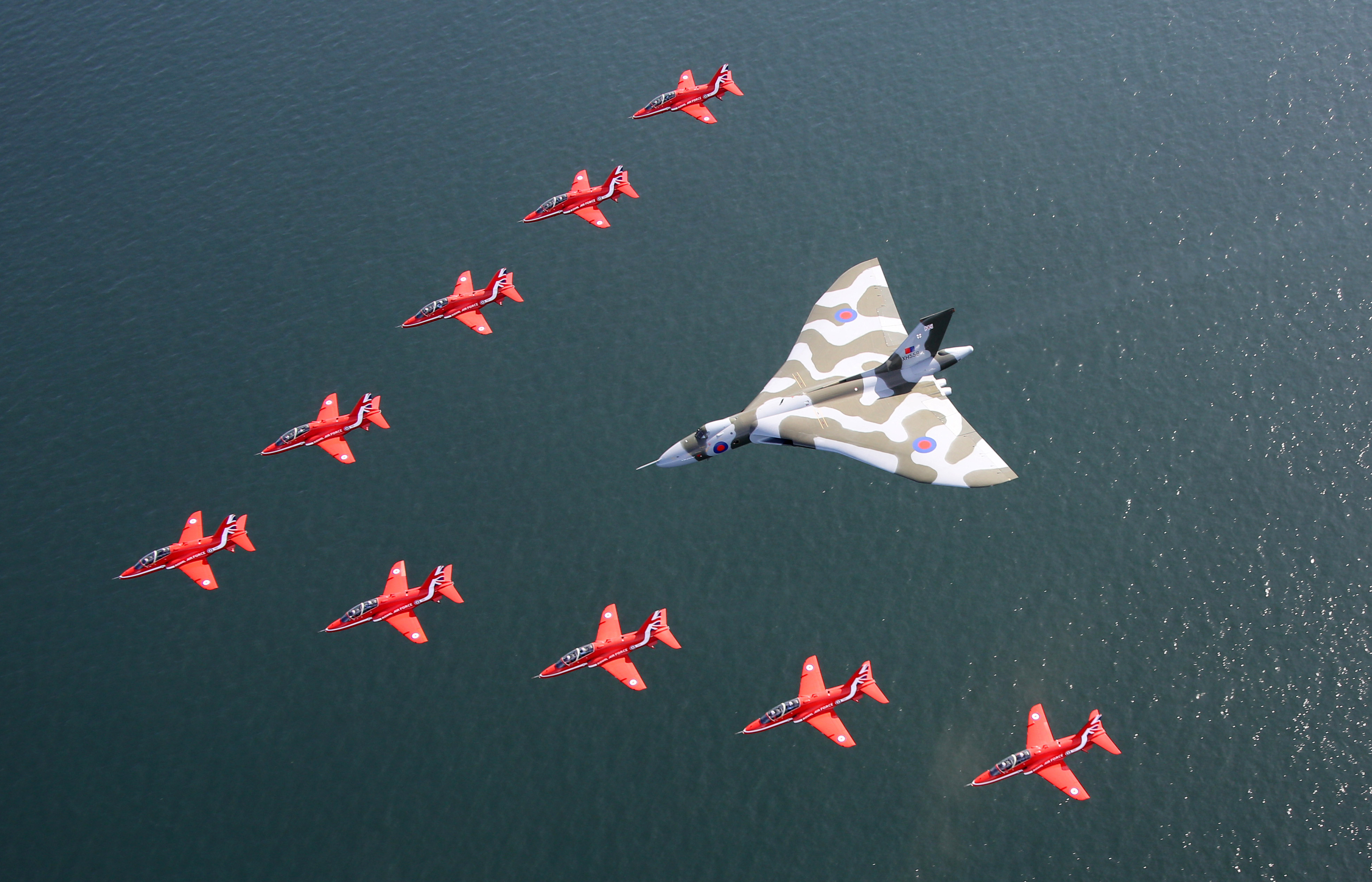
Red Arrows flying with Vulcan XH558 for the last time in 2015
