= Jackie Rimmer =

English footballer

Personal information
- Full name: John Woolfall Rimmer
- Date of birth: 15 March 1910
- Place of birth: Southport, England
- Date of death: 1989 (aged 78 or 79)
- Position: Winger

Senior career*
Years	Team	Apps	(Gls)
1928–1930	Southport	20	(6)
1930–1937	Bolton Wanderers	82	(16)
1937	Burnley	0	(0)
1937–1938	Reading	8	(1)
- * Club domestic league appearances and goals

John Woolfall Rimmer (15 March 1910 – 1989) was an English professional footballer who played as a winger.
