= Lord Street, Southport =

High street of Southport, Lancashire, England

Coordinates: 53.648°N 3.006°W

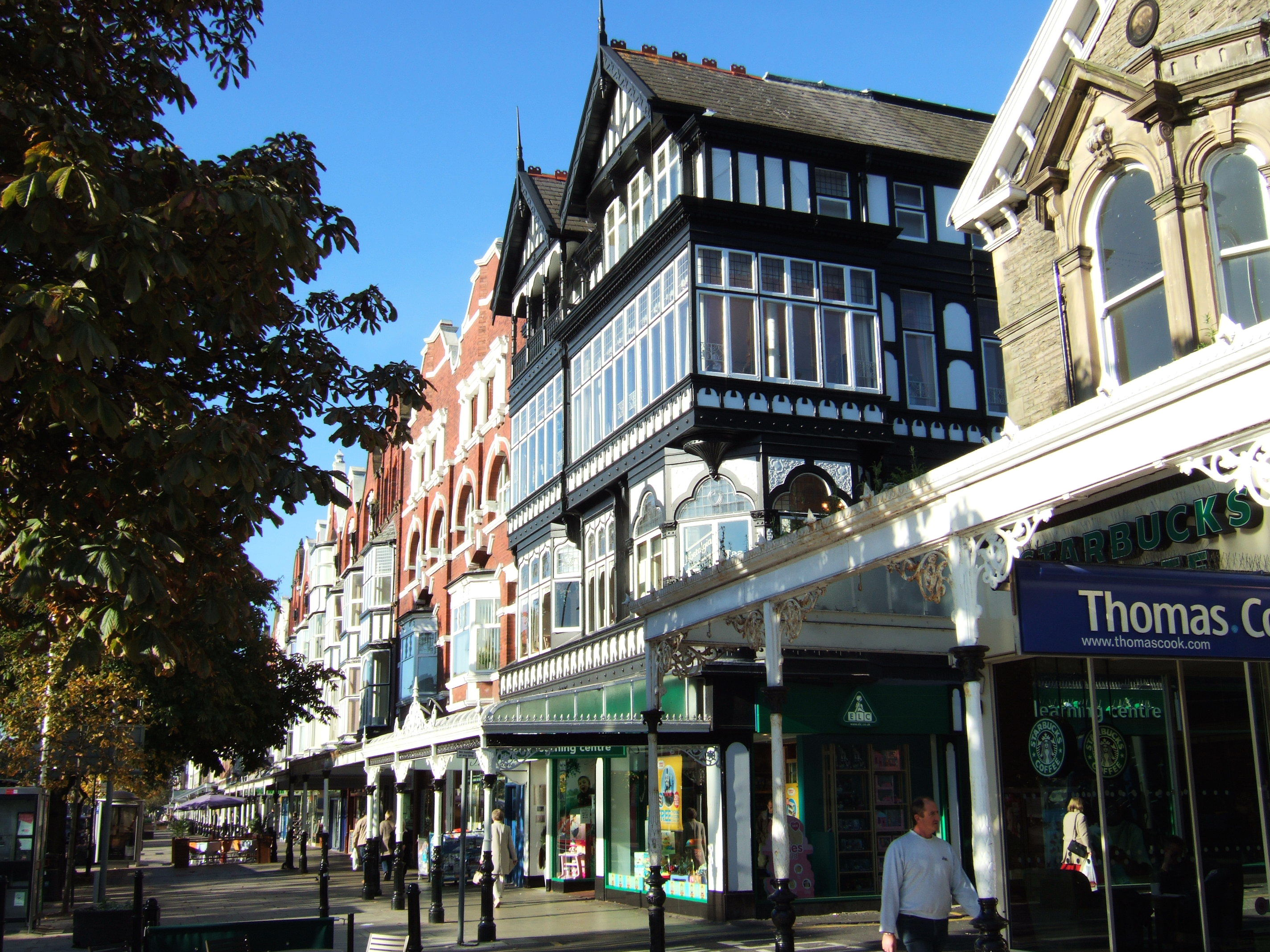
Glazed canopies on shop frontages

Lord Street is the main shopping street of Southport, in Merseyside. It is 1 mile (1.6 km) long, with a roundabout marking each end of the street. There are many water features, gardens and architectural buildings along the entire street, with a mix of residential, commercial and public buildings. It was laid out in the early 19th century.

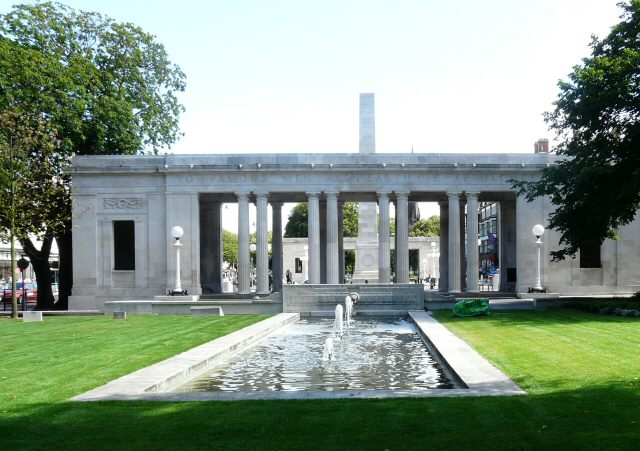
War Memorial Fountains, in Southport Lord Street

Southport Lord Street railway station, which opened on 1 September 1884, was the terminus of the Southport and Cheshire Lines Extension Railway. Although it closed to passengers in 1952, the frontage of the building was retained.

== Influence on Parisian architecture ==
In 1846, Prince Louis-Napoléon Bonaparte, the future Napoléon III, Emperor of the French, lived for a brief period in lodgings just off Lord Street. There is compelling evidence to suggest the street is the inspiration behind the tree-lined boulevards of Paris. Between 1854 and 1870, Napoléon III orchestrated the reconstruction of the French capital. The medieval centre of the city was demolished and replaced with broad tree-lined boulevards, covered walkways and arcades.

== See also ==
- Wayfarers Arcade
- William Sutton (Southport)
- Listed buildings in Southport
