= Philip Naylor-Leyland =

English aristocrat (born 1953)

Lieutenant Sir Philip Naylor-Leyland 4th Baronet
- Born: 9 August 1953 (age 72)
- Education: Eton College; Royal Military Academy Sandhurst; Royal Agricultural University
- Occupations: Landowner, soldier
- Spouse: Lady Isabella Lambton (m. 1980)
- Children: 6
- Parent(s): Sir Vivyan Naylor-Leyland, 3rd Baronet; Elizabeth-Anne FitzAlan-Howard

Sir Philip Naylor-Leyland, 4th Baronet (born 1953) is a British aristocrat and landowner.

== Biography ==
=== Early life ===
Philip Vyvian Naylor-Leyland was born on 9 August 1953. His father was Sir Vivyan Naylor-Leyland, 3rd Baronet (1924–1987) and his mother Hon Elizabeth-Anne Marie Gabrielle FitzAlan-Howard. His paternal grandfather was Sir Albert Edward Herbert Naylor-Leyland, 2nd Baronet (1890–1952). His paternal great-grandfather was Sir Herbert Scarisbrick Naylor-Leyland, 1st Baronet (1864–1899), who served as Member of Parliament for Colchester from 1892 to 1895 and for Southport from 1898 to 1899. His maternal grandfather was Henry FitzAlan-Howard, 2nd Viscount FitzAlan of Derwent (1882–1962), and through him Sir Philip is a descendant of Henry Fitzalan-Howard, 14th Duke of Norfolk, Peter Warren (Royal Navy officer), the Schuyler family, the Van Cortlandt family and the Delancey family of British North America. He was educated at Eton College, a private boarding school in Eton, Berkshire. He graduated from the Royal Military Academy Sandhurst in Sandhurst, Berkshire, the Royal Agricultural University in Cirencester, Gloucestershire, and the New York University Stern School of Business in New York City.

=== Career ===
He served in the Life Guards of the British Army, where he attained the rank of Lieutenant.

Among other properties, he owns the Malton (Fitzwilliam) Estates, which includes offices, shops, pubs, hotels, farms and residential properties near Malton, North Yorkshire.

In 1987, he became 4th Baronet Naylor-Leyland, of Hyde Park House, Albert Gate, London. With his inherited title came paternal family residence of Nantclwyd Hall, a Grade II listed mansion in Llanelidan, Denbighshire, Wales. He also inherited the maternal family residence of Milton Hall near Peterborough, Cambridgeshire.

He has been Master of the Fitzwilliam (Milton) Hunt since 1987. He has served as President of the National Coursing Club since 1988. He served as Vice Chairman of the Peterborough Royal Foxhound Show Society from 1989 to 1995, and has served as its Chairman since 1995.

=== Personal life ===
In 1980, he married Lady Isabella Lambton, daughter of Antony Lambton (who was the 6th Earl of Durham until he disclaimed the title) (1922–2006). They have six children; four sons and two daughters. He is worth an estimated £160m.

Baronetage of the United Kingdom
Preceded by Vivyan Naylor-Leyland	Baronet (of Hyde Park House); 1987–present	Incumbent
