= Vivian Naylor-Leyland =

English aristocrat

Sir Vivian Naylor-Leyland, 3rd Baronet
- Vivian Naylor-Leyland, in 1952
- Born: 5 March 1924
- Died: 2 September 1987 (aged 63)
- Education: Eton College; Christ Church, Oxford; Royal Agricultural University
- Occupations: Lieutenant, banker

Sir Vivyan (or Vyvian) Edward Naylor-Leyland, 3rd Baronet (1924–1987) was a British aristocrat and banker.

== Biography ==
=== Early life ===
Vivian Edward Naylor-Leyland was born on 5 March 1924. His father was Sir Albert Naylor-Leyland, 2nd Baronet (1890–1952) and his mother, Marguerite de Belabre. His paternal grandfather was Sir Herbert Scarisbrick Naylor-Leyland, 1st Baronet (1864–1899), who served as Member of Parliament for Colchester from 1892 to 1895 and for Southport from 1898 to 1899. He grew up at his paternal family residence of Nantclwyd Hall, a Grade II listed mansion in Llanelidan, Denbighshire, Wales.

He was educated at Eton College and graduated from Christ Church, Oxford and the Royal Agricultural University in Cirencester, Gloucestershire.

=== Career ===
He served in the Grenadier Guards of the British Army, becoming Lieutenant.

Later, he made a fortune as a banker in Liverpool.

On 23 September 1952 he became the 3rd Baronet Naylor-Leyland, of Hyde Park House, Albert Gate, London. With his inherited title came the family country seat of Nantclwyd Hall. At Nantclwyd, he commissioned the architect Clough Williams-Ellis (1883–1978) to add a fibreglass temple, a clock tower, a ceremonial arch, gazebos, a dovecote, and formal gardens.

=== Personal life ===
On 17 January 1952 he married Hon. Elizabeth-Anne Marie Gabrielle Fitzalan-Howard, the daughter of Henry FitzAlan-Howard, 2nd Viscount FitzAlan of Derwent (1882–1962) and Joyce Elizabeth Mary Langdale (1898–1995). They had a son, Sir Philip Vyvian Naylor-Leyland, 4th Baronet. On 17 November 1967 he married Noreen Starr Anker Simmons; they had a daughter. Thirdly, he married Jameina Flora Reid. They had two daughters. He died on 2 September 1987 at the age of 63.

Baronetage of the United Kingdom
| Preceded by Albert Naylor-Leyland | Baronet (of Hyde Park House); 1952–1987 | Succeeded by Philip Naylor-Leyland |
