= Wayfarers Arcade =

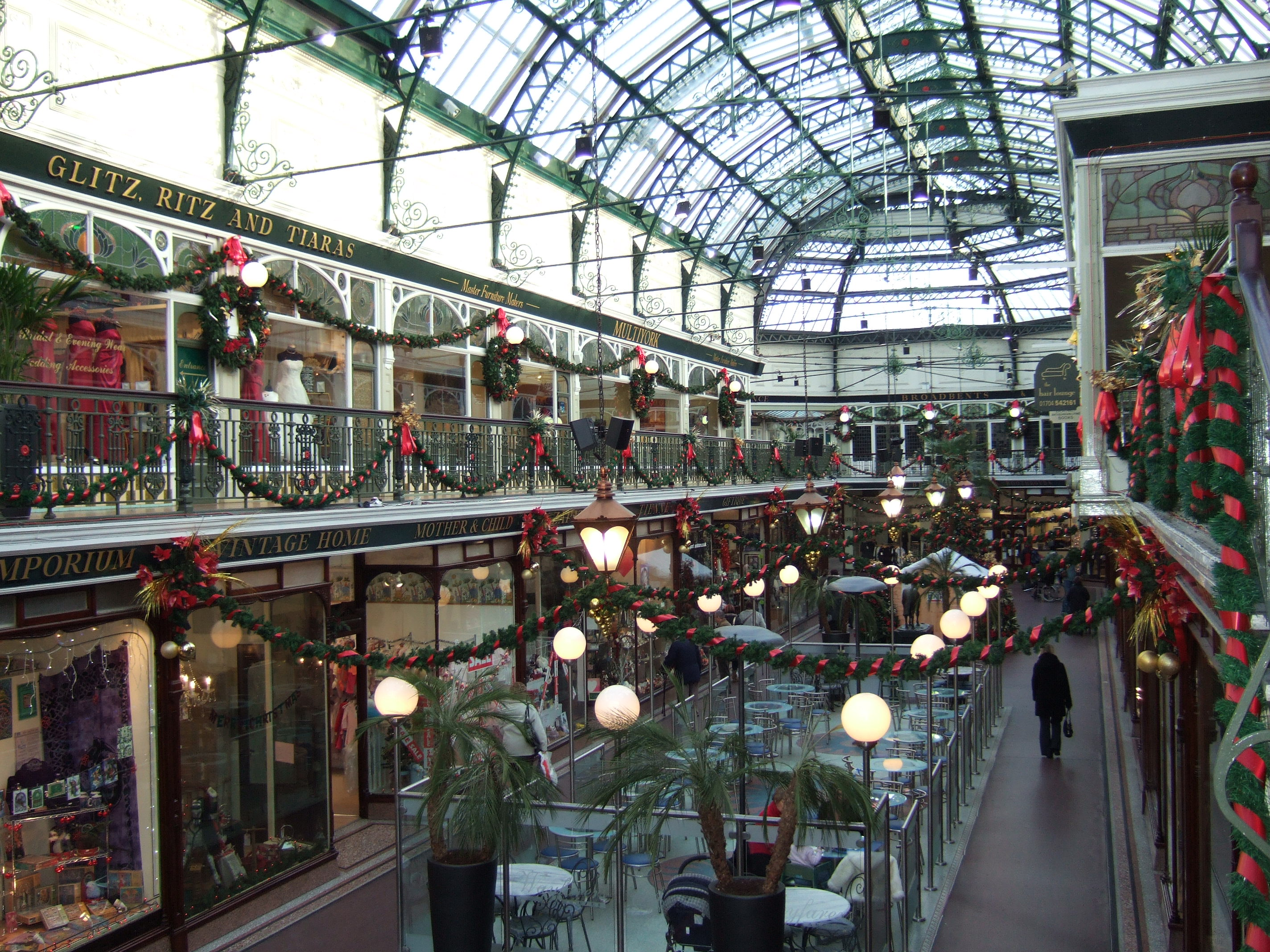
- Wayfarers Arcade decorated for Christmas
- Location: Southport, Merseyside, England
- Coordinates: 53.6485°N 3.0067°W
- Opened: October 1898
- Developer: John Humphrey Plummer
- Manager: Yvonne Burns, Arcade Manager
- Owner: Panther Securities PLC
- Num. of stores: 30+
- Floors: 2
- Parking: Lord Street and side streets
- Website: http://www.wayfarersarcade.com/index.html

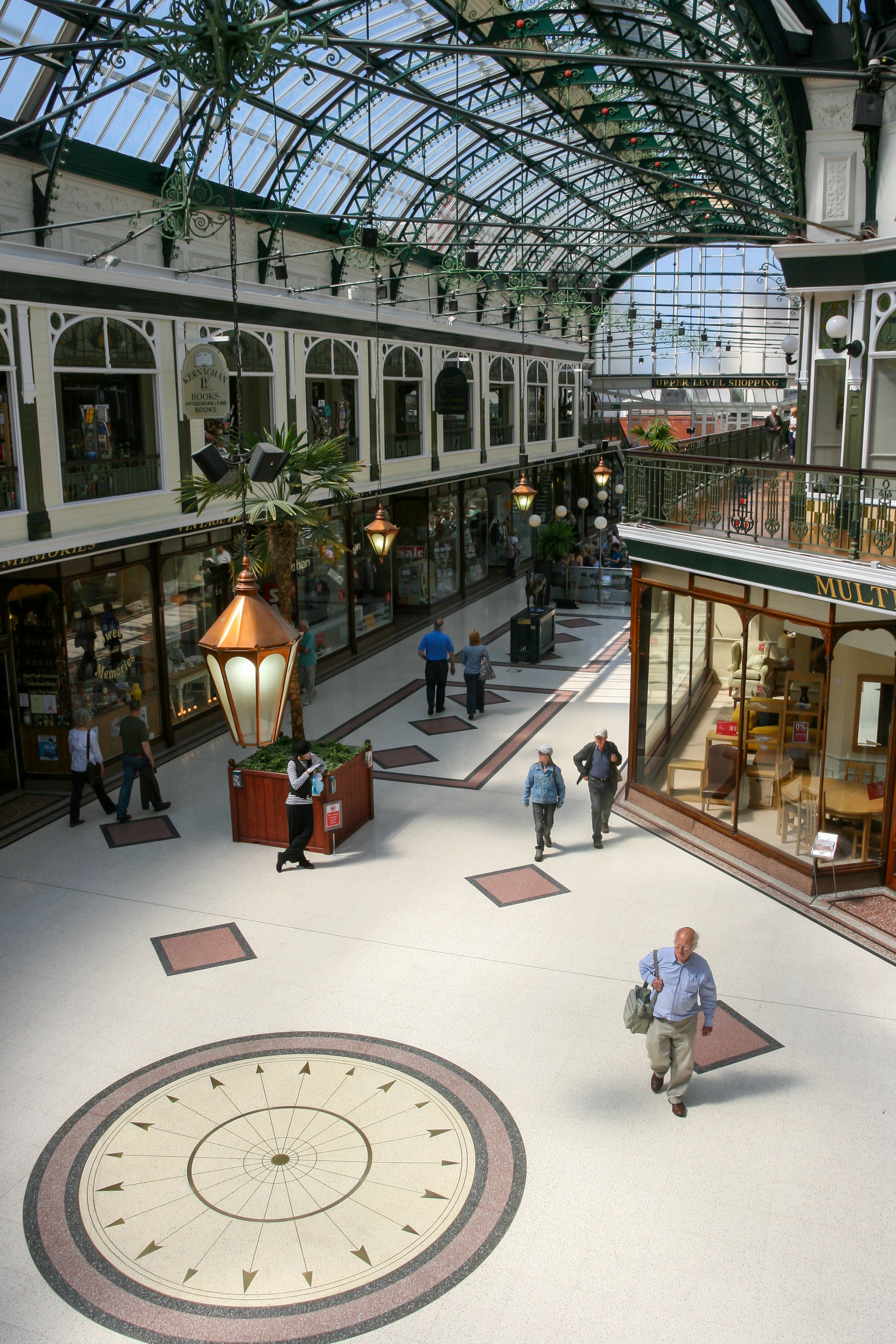
Wayfarers Arcade in 2011.

Wayfarers Arcade (previously the Leyland Arcade and Burton Arcade) is a Grade II listed structure located in the seaside town of Southport, Merseyside on the famous boulevard of Lord Street in the town centre. The arcade is a near untouched building with the glass dome and Victorian shop fronts below it, creating a shopping arcade.

== History ==
The Arcade first opened in October 1898 and was originally called the Leyland Arcade, after Southport MP, Sir Herbert Leyland. The arcade was the idea of John Humphrey Plummer, a Victorian entrepreneur, who at the time owned most of the shops on Lord Street. His idea was to create an indoor shopping area that could be enjoyed in all weather conditions. Due to the existing shops on Lord Street providing him with a good income, he did not want to lose the rent from any of them by decreasing their size. This is the reason for the narrow entrance to the arcade that still exists today.

In 1939 during the outbreak of World War II, the domed roof was painted black as part of blackout precautions, the tropical fish aquarium was removed from the arcade to save electricity.

During the 1950s the arcade was purchased by a tailors business 'Montague Burton', so the arcade was renamed From Leyland Arcade to the Burton Arcade. While under ownership by Burtons major restoration took place by replacing original pitch pine block floor with asphalt. Finally in 1976 the Wayfarers Arcade head lease was acquired by Anthony Pedlar and renamed Wayfarers Arcade.

In 2016, the arcade was acquired by Panther Securities PLC.

== Architecture ==
The design of the building is typically Victorian, with a domed and barrel-vaulted glass roof, supported by decorative iron work, with some stained glass windows and mahogany shop fronts that have been virtually unaltered since the day the arcade opened. There are at least thirty shops which are spread over two floors in the arcade. The upper shopping level features balconies that stretches the majority of the building's length, which can be accessed from three staircases in the arcade.

== Features ==
In the past the arcade has housed brass band concerts on the bandstand, an aquarium and since the 1970s has featured a solid bronze statue of the famous local Grand National racehorse, Red Rum. In 2009 a new cafe opened in the centre of the shops.

== Restoration ==
During the 1980s major investments were completed to restore the central dome in roof and surrounding units that were previously part of Wayfarers Arts. Further investments in 2001 took place to replace the 13m span, barrel vaulted glazed roof, which makes it one of the largest in the UK. Between 2004 and 2007 investments were focused on replacing and French polishing the mahogany shop fronts in the arcade, standardising the sign writing in a heritage font and colours while improving signage for visitors.

In 2008 the 1950s asphalt floor was replaced with new terrazzo tiles, incorporating original mosaic edging and new design features. After the work was finished a party was held in the Arcade, to celebrate the final part of £2m investment.
