= Rhyd-y-Marchogion =

Farm buildings in Denbighshire, Wales

Coordinates: 53.04572°N 3.30702°W

Rhyd-y-Marchogion was a farm in Llanelidan, Denbighshire. The farmhouse, attached cartshed, and garden wall as well as the farmyard buildings are Grade II listed buildings. Both the farmhouse and the farmyard buildings have now been converted into two separate homes.

The name translates literally as "Ford of the Knights". As the Hesbin river flows alongside some of the farmyard buildings, the name implies that knights on horseback used to cross the river at a shallow point nearby. At one time four roads met near the farm gate, and it is unclear whether there was just one or two fords as the Hesbin now runs under B5429 (road) and it is also possible to walk through the river in another direction, following what is now an abandoned trackway. Nearby is the hamlet of Rhyd-y-Meudwy ("Ford of the Hermit").

William Jones (pen name: Ehedydd Iâl) wrote the popular Welsh hymn, Er nad yw 'nghnawd ond gwellt (Literal translation: Though my flesh is nothing but straw) from under a tree in the orchard of Rhyd-y-Marchogion during a heavy storm of thunder and lightning.
