= Edward Naylor-Leyland =

English aristocrat, public official

Sir Edward Naylor-Leyland
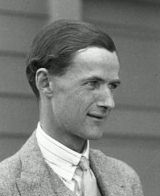
- Edward Naylor-Leyland, in 1920
- Born: 6 December 1890
- Died: 23 September 1952 (aged 61)
- Education: Eton College; Christ Church, Oxford
- Occupations: diplomat, public official
- Parent(s): Sir Herbert Scarisbrick Naylor-Leyland, 1st Baronet; Jeanie Willson Chamberlain

Sir Albert Edward Herbert Naylor-Leyland, 2nd Baronet (6 December 1890 – 23 September 1952) was an English aristocrat, diplomat and public official.

== Biography ==
=== Early life ===
Albert Edward Herbert Naylor-Leyland was born on 6 December 1890. His father was Sir Herbert Scarisbrick Naylor-Leyland, 1st Baronet (1864–1899), who served as Member of Parliament for Colchester from 1892 to 1895 and for Southport from 1898 to 1899. His mother was Jeanie Willson Chamberlain, daughter of Mr and Mrs William Selah Chamberlain of Cleveland, Ohio. He had a brother, George Vyvyan Naylor-Leyland (1892–1914), who was killed in action during the First World War. He grew up at his paternal family residence of Nantclwyd Hall, a Grade II listed mansion in Llanelidan, Denbighshire, Wales. King Edward VII (1841–1910) was his godfather.

He was educated at Eton College, a private boarding school in Eton, Berkshire. While he was at Eton, he and his brother escaped a kidnapping, where the intent was to hold them hostage for ransom. He graduated from Christ Church, Oxford, a constituent college of the University of Oxford.

=== Career ===
He served as Honourable Attaché to Bern, Switzerland and Paris, France. He served as High Sheriff of Denbighshire in 1921. He also served as Justice of the Peace for Denbighshire.

On 7 May 1899 he became 2nd Baronet Naylor-Leyland, of Hyde Park House, Albert Gate, London. Upon inheriting the title from his late father, he also inherited two properties: Nantclwyd Hall in Wales, and Hyde Park House in Albert Gate, Knightsbridge, London.

=== Personal life ===
On 10 April 1923 he married Marguerite Helene Marie Fradin de Belabre. They had three sons – the eldest being Sir Vivyan Edward Naylor-Leyland, 3rd Baronet – and a daughter. He died on 23 September 1952.

Baronetage of the United Kingdom
Preceded by Herbert Naylor-Leyland	Baronet (of Hyde Park House); 1899–1952	Succeeded by Vivian Naylor-Leyland
