= Afon y Maes =

River in Wales

Coordinates: 53°03′38″N 3°19′31″W

Afon y Maes is a tributary river to the Clwyd and flows through the village of Llanelidan, Denbighshire, Wales. The river starts to the south of the village and joins up to the Clwyd on land behind Nantclwyd Hall, and therefore it is a relatively short river that starts and ends in the same town.
