= Milton Hall =

Historical Cambridgeshire home of the Fitzwilliam family

Coordinates: 52.5845°N 0.3116°W

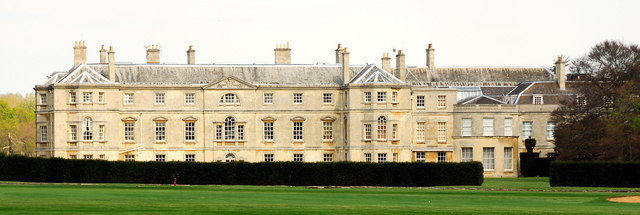
The Palladian south front of Milton Hall

Milton Hall near Peterborough, is the largest private house in Cambridgeshire, England. As part of the Soke of Peterborough, it was formerly in Northamptonshire. It dates from 1594, being the historical home of the Fitzwilliam family, and is situated in an extensive park in which some original oak trees from an earlier Tudor deer park survive. The house is a Grade I listed building; the garden is Grade II*.

== Location ==
The gardens and pleasure grounds of Milton Park are about 3 miles (5 km) from Peterborough city centre, off the A47 road, and are about 35 acres (14 ha) to the south of the house. There are views of the park from both sides of the house. The house and grounds are private and not open to the public; however, Peterborough Milton Golf Club has a par 71 parkland course set in the grounds of the estate, with many of the holes being played in full view of Milton Hall.

== History ==
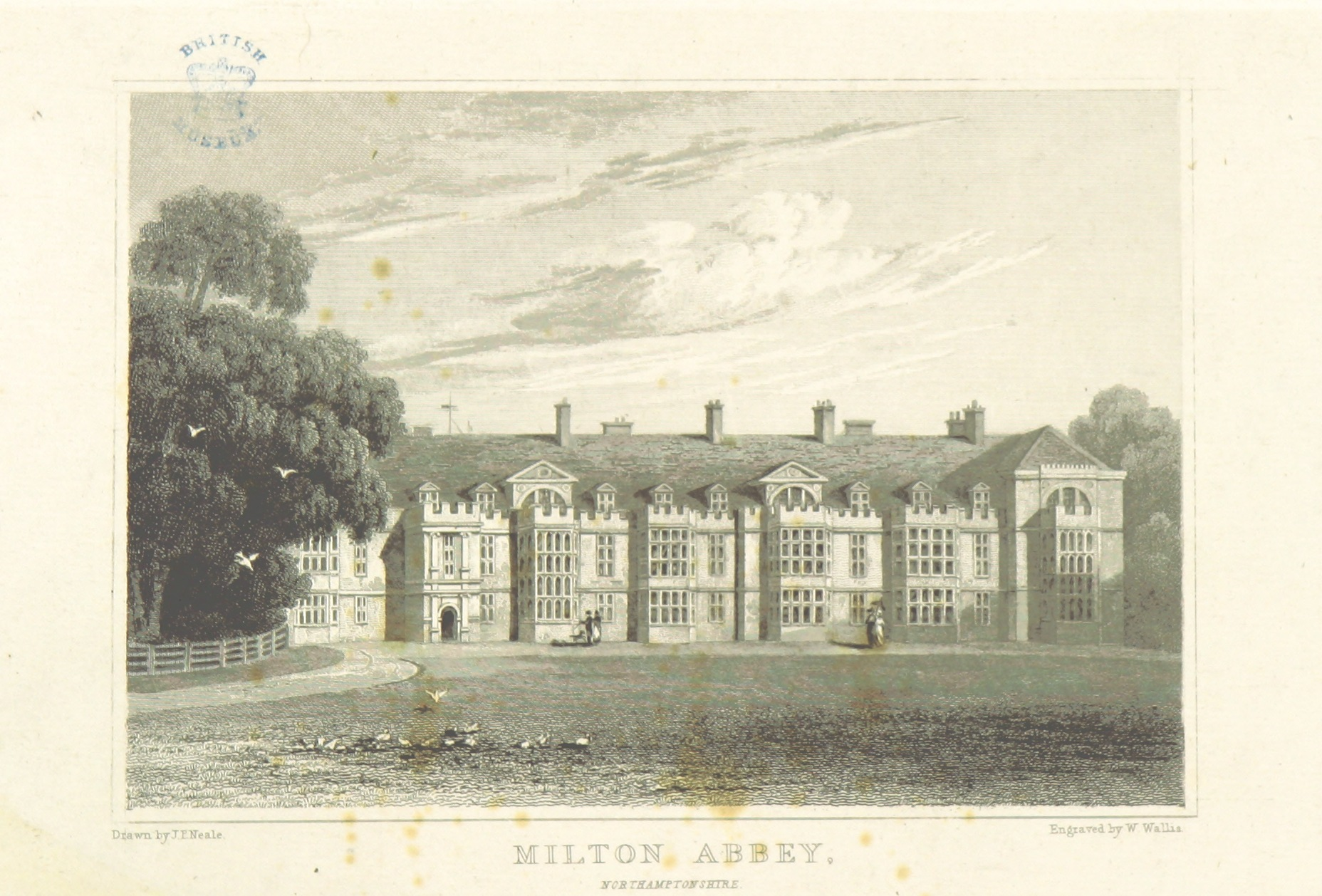
The north front of "Milton Abbey" by John Preston Neale, from volume 3 of Views of the Seats of Noblemen and Gentlemen in England, Wales, Scotland and Ireland (1818)

In the Middle Ages, Milton was a hamlet in the parish of Castor. The manor of Milton was bought from Robert Wittlebury in 1502 by Sir William Fitzwilliam, a wealthy merchant from an old Yorkshire family. He was knighted in 1515 and died in 1534.

The oldest parts of the Hall were built in the 1590s by William's grandson, the third William Fitzwilliam and Lord Deputy of Ireland, who also began to lay out grounds. He was succeeded in 1599 by his son, the fourth William, who continued to work on the Hall and possibly developed the landscape. Extracts from his household accounts have been published. On his death in 1618, he was succeeded by his son, later the first Baron Fitzwilliam, whose granddaughter Jane married Sir Christopher Wren. A plan dated 1643 records the grounds at this time enclosed by a moat and containing courtyards, fishponds, orchards, and gardens.

The third Baron was elevated to Viscount Milton and Earl Fitzwilliam, and it was he who added the imposing stables in about 1690, choosing William Talman and John Sturges as his architects. John Fitzwilliam, the second Earl, succeeded in 1719 and the following year completed an extension to the stable block and continued the work his father had started on enlarging the park and altering the gardens to the south of the Hall to include the walled enclosures which still survive.

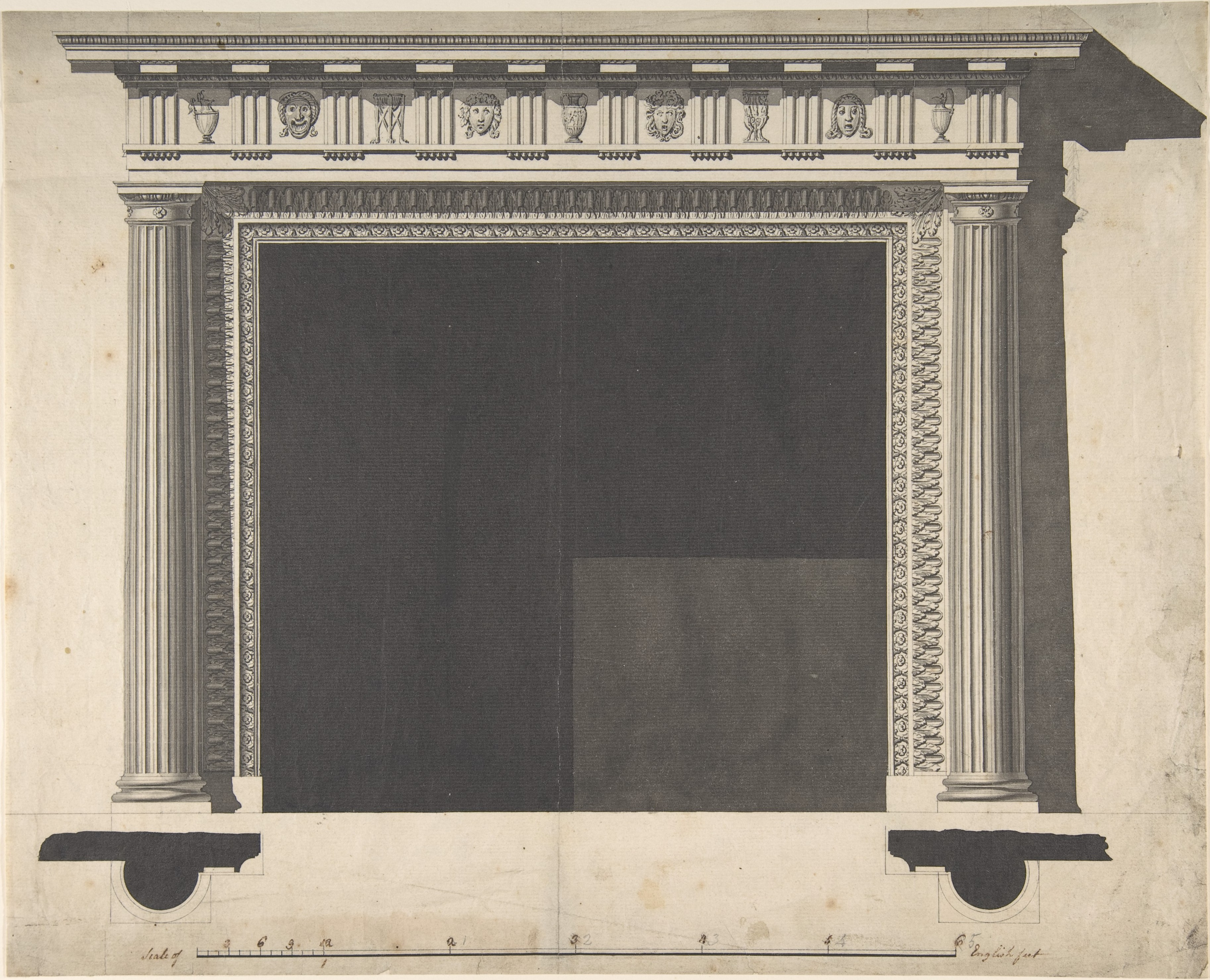
Design for a Chimney-piece, for the Saloon, Milton Park, Northamptonshire by Sir William Chambers

John's son William, the third Earl, married Lady Anne Wentworth, daughter of the first Marquess of Rockingham. In 1750, after abortive projects commissioned by his grandfather and father from Talman, Gibbs, and Brettingham for modernising the Hall, the third Earl engaged Lord Rockingham's architect Henry Flitcroft to begin the process, and a new south front was added. Following the death of the third Earl in 1756, the work on the Hall was completed by Sir William Chambers for his son William, the fourth Earl, in 1773. In 1782, however, the fourth Earl succeeded to Wentworth Woodhouse on the death of his uncle the second Lord Rockingham, and this became his principal seat, the family moving to Milton only in the winter for the hunting. To facilitate this, he commissioned Humphry Repton (1752–1818) to offer advice on improvements to the park in 1791.

The fourth Earl died in 1833 at the age of 85 leaving his properties to his only son, Lord Milton. With Wentworth Woodhouse the principal seat of the family, the fifth Earl left Milton to his younger son, George Wentworth-FitzWilliam, in 1857. George lived at Milton until after 1912 and is thought to have commissioned Harold Peto to produce plans for a garden within one of the 18th century walled enclosures.

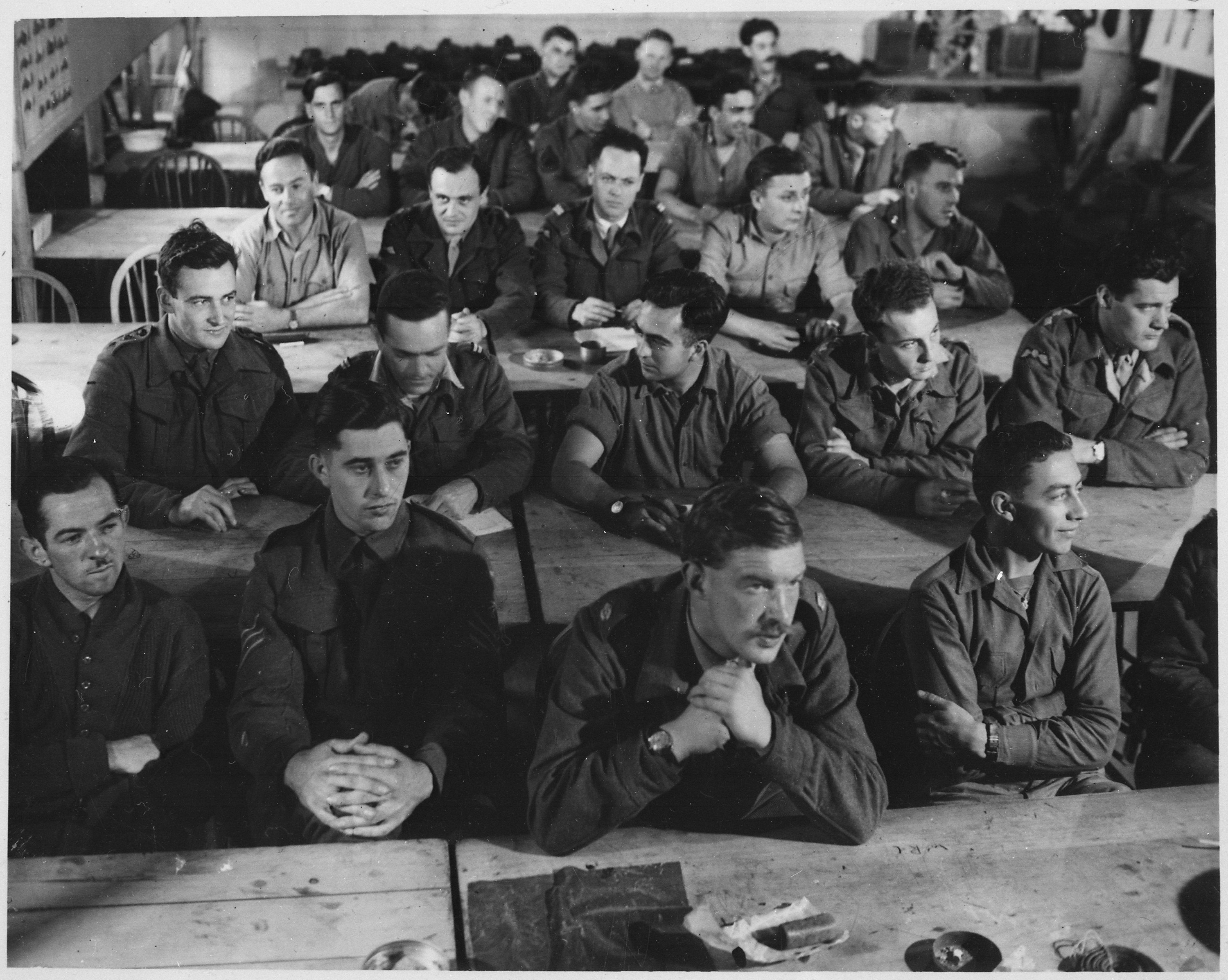
Audience in a demolition class, Milton Hall, circa 1944

The Hall was used by the military during both world wars. In the First World War, an auxiliary hospital was set up in the house. During the Second World War, part of the house and the stable block were occupied by the Czechoslovak Army and later Special Operations Executive who trained in the grounds and woods prior to being dropped by parachute behind enemy lines in France in the days leading up to the Normandy landings (see Operation Jedburgh). After the war, Lord and Lady Fitzwilliam returned to Milton to make it their home. The Earl died in 1979 and the Countess in 1995, at which time the estate passed to Sir Philip Naylor-Leyland, 4th Baronet.

Thomas Wentworth-Fitzwilliam, 10th Earl Fitzwilliam (28 May 1904 – 21 September 1979) married, in April 1956, Joyce Elizabeth Mary Langdale (1898 – June 1995), eldest daughter and heiress of Lieutenant-Colonel Philip Joseph Langdale (1863–1950), OBE, JP, DL, of Houghton Hall, Yorkshire, and formerly the wife of Henry FitzAlan-Howard, 2nd Viscount FitzAlan of Derwent (1883 – 1962), from whom she was divorced in 1955. Joyce Langdale by her first marriage had two daughters. The younger was Elizabeth Anne Marie Gabrielle FitzAlan-Howard (26 January 1934 – 20 March 1997) who married firstly in 1952, Sir Vivyan Edward Naylor-Leyland, 3rd Baronet (1924 – 2 September 1987). Their son and heir, Sir Philip Vivyan Naylor-Leyland, 4th Baronet (born 9 August 1953) succeeded his father in 1987, and his grandmother and mother to the stewardship of the FitzWilliam estates. He married, in 1980, Lady Isabella Lambton. Elizabeth-Anne's first marriage was dissolved in 1960 and she married, secondly, in 1975, Sir Stephen Hastings (4 May 1921 – January 2005).

=== Link to Daphne du Maurier ===
In 1917 when the hall housed an auxiliary hospital, Daphne du Maurier made the first of several visits to Milton at the age of ten along with her mother and two sisters. It is clear from correspondence in later life between du Maurier and the 10th Earl that the happiness and freedom experienced during these childhood visits made an impact on the future writer which she never forgot. She told Lord Fitzwilliam that when she wrote Rebecca 20 years later, the interior of Manderley was based on her recollection of the rooms and 'big house feel' of Milton in the First World War, and referred to Milton in a letter to the last Lord Fitzwilliam as "dear old Milton."

=== Link to Margaret Thatcher ===
During the Falklands War, on 30 April 1982, the Prime Minister Margaret Thatcher and her husband Denis stayed overnight at Milton following an engagement in Sir Stephen's Bedfordshire constituency. The following morning, the PM took a call to tell her that an RAF Vulcan had successfully bombed the airfield at Port Stanley.

== Homonymous buildings ==
Milton Hall is not to be confused with various other buildings, including another Milton Hall in Cambridgeshire at Milton near Cambridge, which is a manor house, now used as office accommodation; Sir Clive Sinclair occupied it prior to its current usage. Pi Innovo (Note: Formerly Pi Shurlok; Pi Technology; and Pi Research.) were also previous tenants.

Others of the name are in Deansgate, Manchester and in Elsecar, Barnsley. Milton Hall Primary School is in Westcliff-on-Sea. There is also a Milton Hall in Swords, County Dublin, Ireland.

In Tasmania, Australia, there is Christ Church and Milton Hall, Launceston.
