= Viscount FitzAlan of Derwent =

Title in the Peerage of the United Kingdom

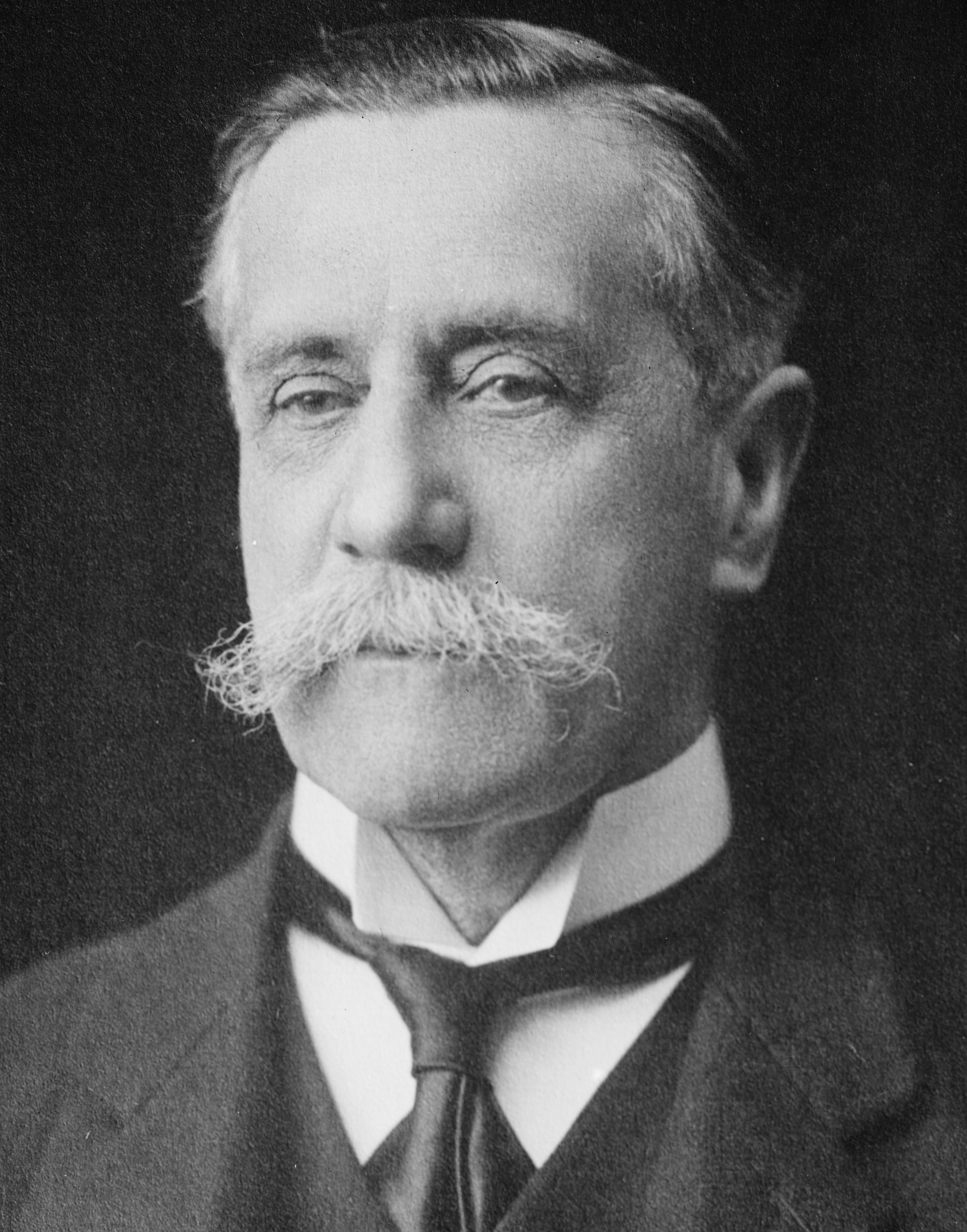
Edmund FitzAlan-Howard, 1st Viscount FitzAlan of Derwent.

Viscount FitzAlan of Derwent, of Derwent in the County of Derby, was a title in the Peerage of the United Kingdom. It was created in 1921 for Lord Edmund Talbot on his appointment as Lord Lieutenant of Ireland. Born Lord Edmund FitzAlan-Howard, he was the third born, but second surviving son of Henry Fitzalan-Howard, 14th Duke of Norfolk. In 1876 he assumed by Royal licence the surname of Talbot in lieu of his patronymic in an unsuccessful attempt to succeed to the estates of Bertram, 17th Earl of Shrewsbury and Waterford, having been named by will as his successor and chief beneficiary. Shortly after being raised to the peerage he resumed his first surname. The title became extinct on the death of his son, the second Viscount, in 1962.

== Viscounts FitzAlan of Derwent (1921) ==
- Edmund Bernard FitzAlan-Howard, 1st Viscount FitzAlan of Derwent (1855–1947)
- Henry Edmund FitzAlan-Howard, 2nd Viscount FitzAlan of Derwent (1883–1962)

== See also ==
- Duke of Norfolk
- Baron Howard of Glossop
