= Edmund FitzAlan-Howard, 1st Viscount FitzAlan of Derwent =

British politician

The Right Honourable The Viscount FitzAlan of Derwent KG KP GCVO DSO PC
- FitzAlan in 1921

Lord Lieutenant of Ireland
- In office 27 April 1921 – 6 December 1922
- Monarch: George V
- Prime Minister: David Lloyd George; Bonar Law
- Preceded by: The Viscount French
- Succeeded by: Office abolished

Personal details
- Born: 1 June 1855 St James's, Westminster, London
- Died: 18 May 1947 (aged 91) Cumberland Lodge, Windsor
- Party: Conservative
- Spouse(s): Lady Mary Bertie (1859–1938)
- Children: Hon. Mary Fitzalan-Howard; Henry FitzAlan-Howard, 2nd Viscount FitzAlan of Derwent
- Parent(s): Henry Fitzalan-Howard, 14th Duke of Norfolk; Hon. Augusta Lyons

Edmund Bernard FitzAlan-Howard, 1st Viscount FitzAlan of Derwent (1 June 1855 – 18 May 1947), known as The Honourable Edmund Fitzalan-Howard between 1855 and 1856, Lord Edmund Fitzalan-Howard between 1856 and 1876, and Lord Edmund Talbot between 1876 and 1921, was a British Conservative politician and the last Lord Lieutenant of Ireland. He was the first Roman Catholic to be appointed Lord Lieutenant of Ireland since the 17th century, holding office when Ireland was partitioned into Southern Ireland and Northern Ireland.

== Background ==
FitzAlan was born at 11 Carlton House Terrace, Westminster, the second son of Henry Fitzalan-Howard, 14th Duke of Norfolk by his wife the Hon. Augusta Lyons, daughter of Vice-Admiral Edmund Lyons, 1st Baron Lyons, and the younger brother of Henry Fitzalan-Howard, 15th Duke of Norfolk. He was principal beneficiary named in the will of Bertram Arthur Talbot, 17th Earl of Shrewsbury (1832–1856) provided he took the surname and arms of "Talbot", which he did by royal licence in 1876. However, the late earl's distant relatives contested the will, and the peerage and concomitant property were awarded after much litigation to Henry Chetwynd-Talbot, 3rd Earl Talbot, leaving Lord Edmund Talbot with only scattered minor lands. He returned to the use of his paternal name by royal licence in 1921, shortly after being raised to the peerage.

== Career ==
Talbot was elected member of parliament for Chichester in 1894, a seat he held until 1921.

In 1899 he was appointed, by Redvers Buller, as the military censor of telegraph communications in Cape Town, South Africa, on the outbreak of the Boer War. He later served briefly under Arthur Balfour as a Lord of the Treasury in 1905 and under H. H. Asquith and later David Lloyd George as Parliamentary Secretary to the Treasury from 1915 to 1921 (jointly from December 1916 onwards). In 1918 he was sworn of the Privy Council.

On 27 April 1921 he was appointed Lord Lieutenant of Ireland, the first Roman Catholic to be appointed to the position since 1685 during the reign of King James II. His appointment was possible because Section 37 of the Government of Ireland Act 1920 had been brought into force shortly beforehand. That provision provided that no British subject would be disqualified from holding the position on account of his religious belief. Concerning the announcement of his impending appointment, the Daily Chronicle observed that "the concillatory motive of his appointment [being a Roman Catholic] is obvious...it is an olive branch in place of a dictatorship."

However, his tenure as Lord Lieutenant lasted only a year and a half. The post was abolished with the coming into existence of the Irish Free State and its constitution in 1922. The position was replaced by the offices of the Governor-General of the Irish Free State and the Governor of Northern Ireland. The day after his appointment as Lord Lieutenant he was raised to the Peerage as Viscount FitzAlan of Derwent, of Derwent in the County of Derby. In addition, during the minority of his nephew the 16th Duke of Norfolk, who succeeded to the dukedom in 1917, he served as Deputy Earl Marshal.

He was appointed Knight Companion of the Order of the Garter (KG) in 1925.

== Personal life ==
FitzAlan married Lady Mary Bertie, daughter of Montagu Bertie, 7th Earl of Abingdon, on 5 August 1879. They lived at Cumberland Lodge in Windsor Great Park and had two children:

- Hon Mary Caroline Magdalan Fitzalan-Howard (born 24 August 1880, died 24 November 1974)
- Henry Edmund Fitzalan-Howard, 2nd Viscount FitzAlan of Derwent (born 30 October 1883, died 17 May 1962)

FitzAlan died on 18 May 1947 at the age of 91, and was succeeded in the viscountcy by his only son, Henry.

In his thirties, FitzAlan – then known as Lord Edmund Talbot – was the patron of Chichester City F.C.

== Titles ==
- 1855–1856: The Honourable Edmund Fitzalan-Howard
- 1856–1876: The Lord Edmund Fitzalan-Howard
- 1876–1921: The Lord Edmund Talbot
- 1921–1947: The Right Honourable The Viscount FitzAlan of Derwent

Parliament of the United Kingdom
Preceded by Lord Walter Gordon-Lennox	Member of Parliament for Chichester; 1894 – 1921	Succeeded by Sir William Bird
Political offices
Preceded by John Gulland	Parliamentary Secretary to the Treasury; 1915–1921; With: Neil James Archibald Primrose 1916–1917; Hon. Frederick Guest 1917–1921	Succeeded by Charles McCurdy; Leslie Orme Wilson
Government offices
Preceded by The Viscount French of Ypres	Lord Lieutenant of Ireland; 1921–1922	Succeeded by Position replaced by the Governor-General of the Irish Free State and the Governor of Northern Ireland
Peerage of the United Kingdom
New creation	Viscount FitzAlan of Derwent; 1921–1947	Succeeded by Henry FitzAlan-Howard
