= Naylor-Leyland baronets =

Baronetcy in the Baronetage of the United Kingdom

The Naylor-Leyland Baronetcy, of Hyde Park House, Albert Gate, in the County of London, is a title in the Baronetage of the United Kingdom. It was created on 31 August 1895 for Herbert Naylor-Leyland, Conservative Member of Parliament for Colchester from 1892 to 1895 and Liberal Member of Parliament for Southport from 1898 to 1899. The second Baronet served as Sheriff of Denbighshire in 1921.

The first baronet took his title from Hyde Park House (60 Knightsbridge, now the Royal Thames Yacht Club), a mansion built in 1855 for his grandfather, the banker Thomas Leyland, by Thomas Cubitt.

== Naylor-Leyland baronets, of Hyde Park House (1895) ==
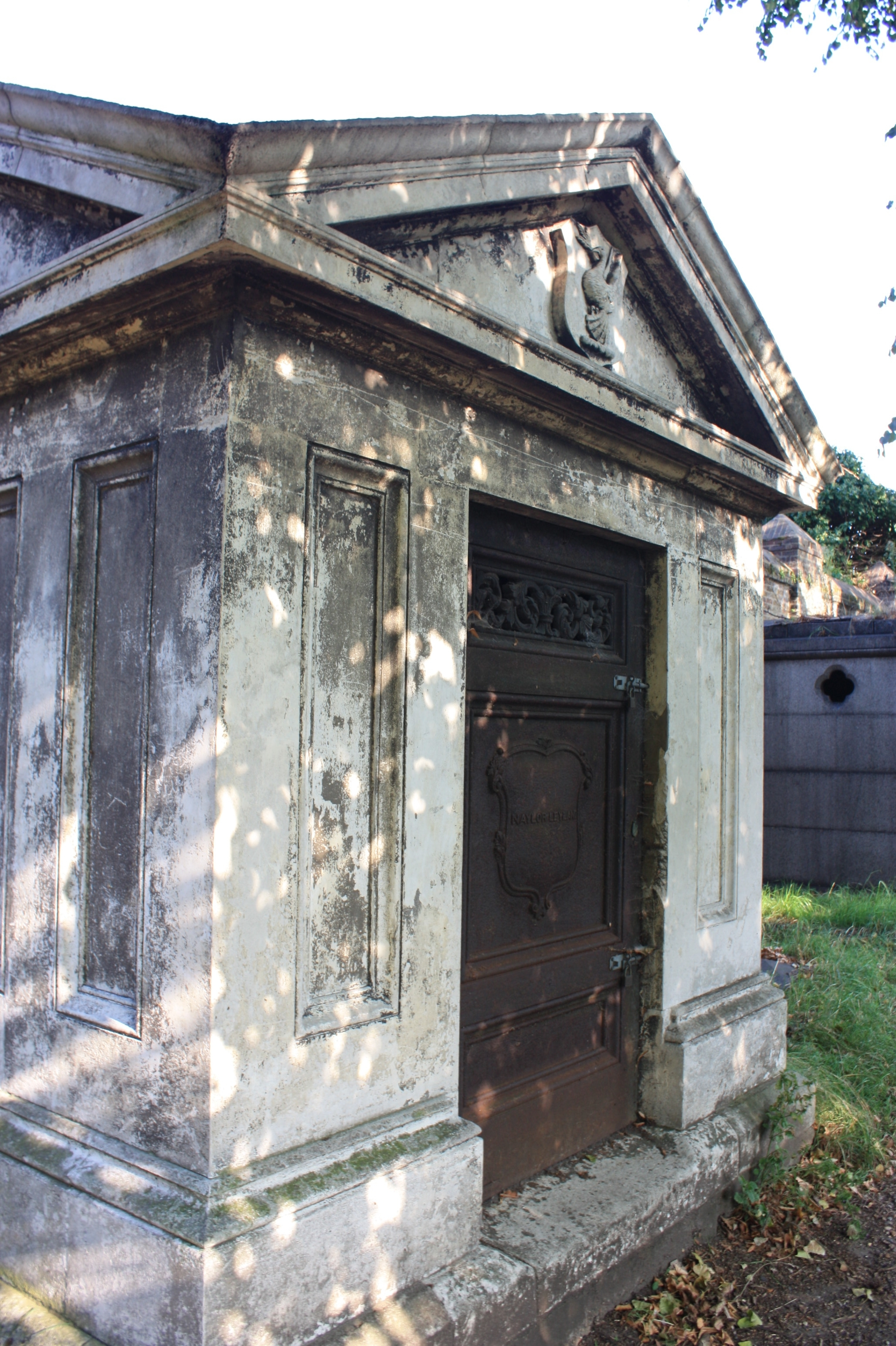
The Naylor-Leyland mausoleum, Brompton Cemetery, London

- Sir Herbert Scarisbrick Naylor-Leyland, 1st Baronet (1864–1899). He was married to an American heiress, Jeanie Willson Chamberlain, daughter of William Selah Chamberlain of Cleveland, Ohio, and had two sons by her. The eldest and only surviving son was:
- Sir Albert Edward Herbert Naylor-Leyland, 2nd Baronet (6 December 1890 – 23 September 1952), a godson of King Edward VII.
- Sir Vivyan (or Vyvian) Edward Naylor-Leyland, 3rd Baronet (5 March 1924 – 2 September 1987, Guernsey)
- Sir Philip Vyvyan Naylor-Leyland, 4th Baronet (born 9 August 1953), of Nantclwyd Hall, Ruthin, North Wales and Milton Hall, Peterborough, Cambridgeshire

The heir apparent to the title is Thomas Philip Naylor-Leyland (born 1982).

Baronetage of the United Kingdom
Preceded by Blyth baronets	Naylor-Leyland baronets of Hyde Park House; 31 August 1895	Succeeded by Agnew baronets
