= Eubule Thelwall (landowner) =

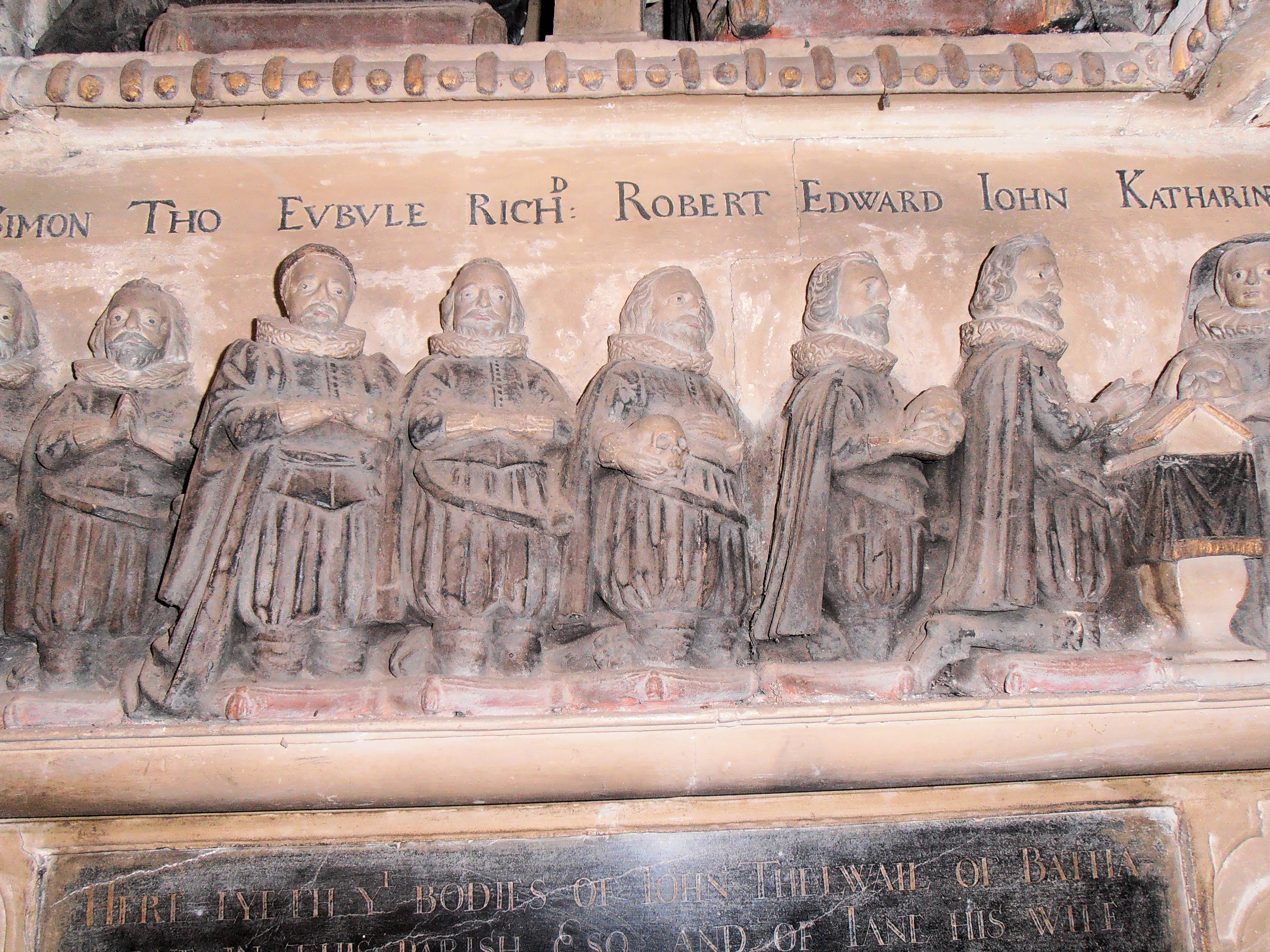
Eubule Thelwall with brothers on their father's memorial at Llanrhudd Church, Ruthin – known locally as the "Thelwall's Church"

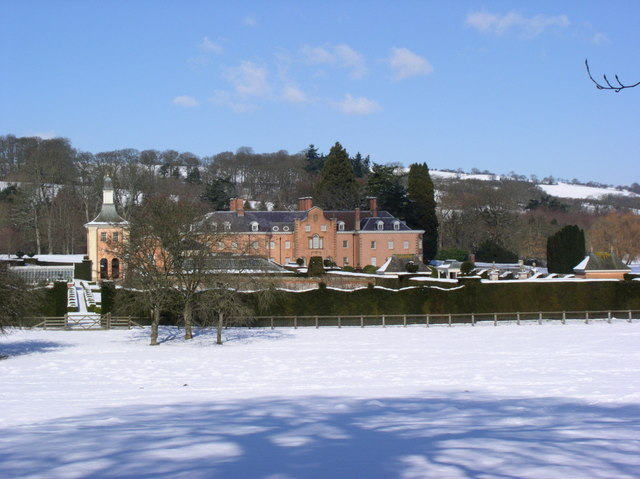
Nantclwyd Hall in winter

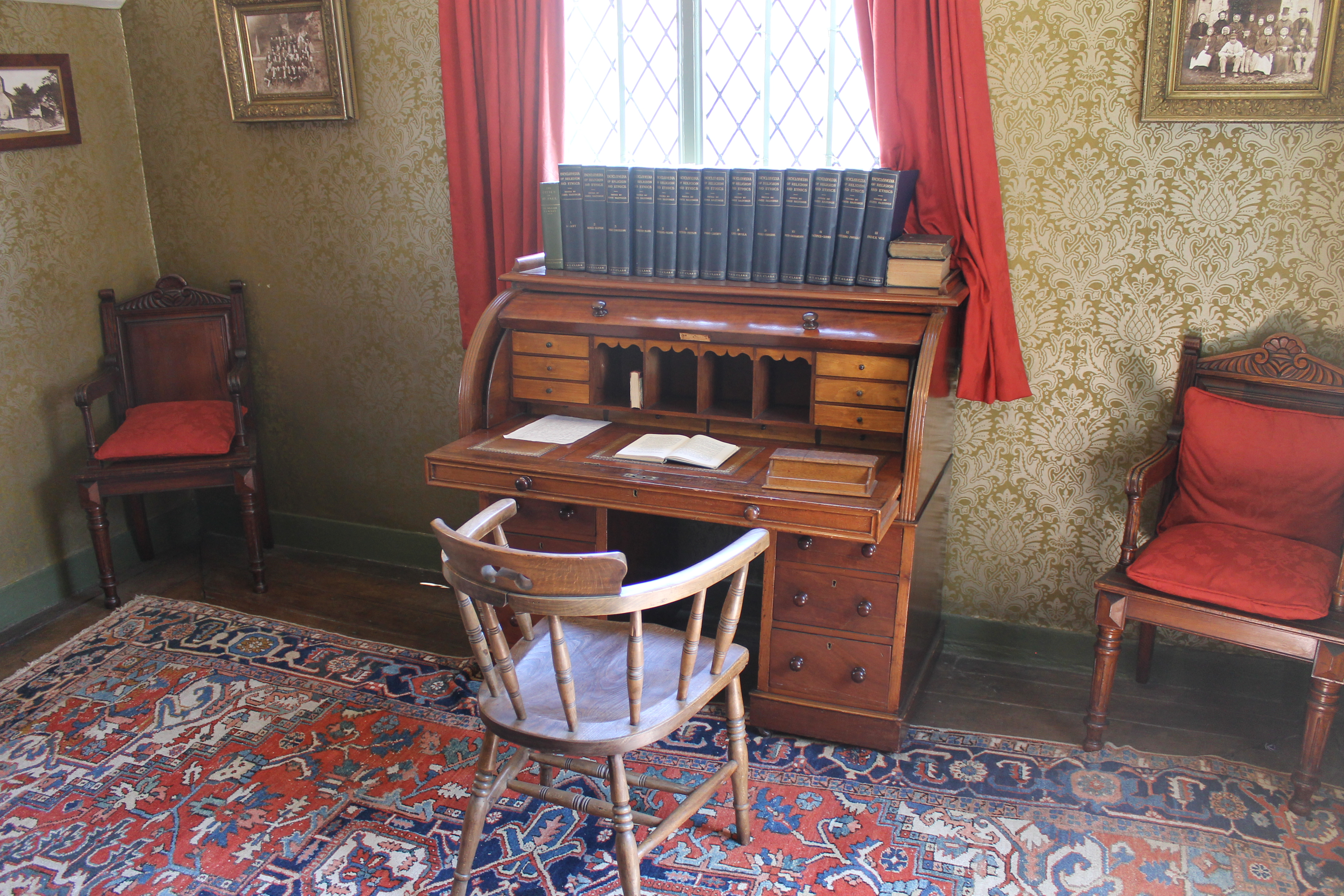
Thelwall's study at Nantclwyd y Dre, Ruthin

Eubule Thelwall (1622 – 4 February 1694) was a landowner and solicitor who held legal offices in North Wales and Cheshire, and the third son of John Thelwall of Bathafarn Park, Ruthin. In 1646 he served in the siege of Denbigh Castle and was sent by William Salesbury, the castle's governor, to Charles I to seek his permission to surrender. Thelwall married Marry Parry, the heiress of Nantclwyd estate in 1653 and instigated a complete rebuild of the building and of a second, smaller building in the nearby town of Ruthin: Nantclwyd y Dre, which is Wales's oldest dated timbered town house.

Sir Eubule Thelwall (c. 1557 – 8 October 1630), Principal of Jesus College, Oxford was his great-uncle.

== Career ==
Thelwall entered Gray's Inn in 1635 and appears to have worked in the law and lived mainly in London; much of his property was destroyed by the Great Fire of London of 1666 and by 1662 he was back in the Vale of Clwyd. Deeds of the Nantclwyd Estate shows that he bought land to add to this estate in the 1660s.

He was stewart to the lordship of Ruthin until 1677 and in 1670 became chief steward of the manors and land of the Bishop of St Asaph in Flintshire and Denbighshire, and Vice-Chamberlain of the Palatinate of Chester.

His will mentions that he gave up his legal practice because of deafness.

== Nantclwyd Estate ==
Thelwall built the earliest surviving parts of Nantclwyd Hall and extended the estate. He also added greatly to Nantclwyd y Dre giving the front of the house much of its present appearance including the projecting North-East range and the rear parlour range. He lived at this house from around 1688 when his son (also named Eubule) took over the main Nantclwyd estate. When the son died in 1713 the male line of the Thelwalls of Nantclwyd ended and the main estate at Llanelidan passed on to his daughter Martha and Nantclwyd y Dre to his youngest daughter Mary.

== Memorial ==
A monument was erected in his memory by his devoted widow which lists his eleven children, of whom six died before him. Eubule junior succeeded him in 1695 and became High Sheriff of Denbighshire in 1702; like his father, he was a sober and devout man.

== The family ==
The family had come to Ruthin from the Thelwall area of Cheshire. Most were lawyers and spoke Welsh; indeed it is known that many employed a family poet as was traditionally for wealthy families in Wales. For example, the poet Simwnt Fychan was employed by Simon Thelwall the judge at Plas y Ward.

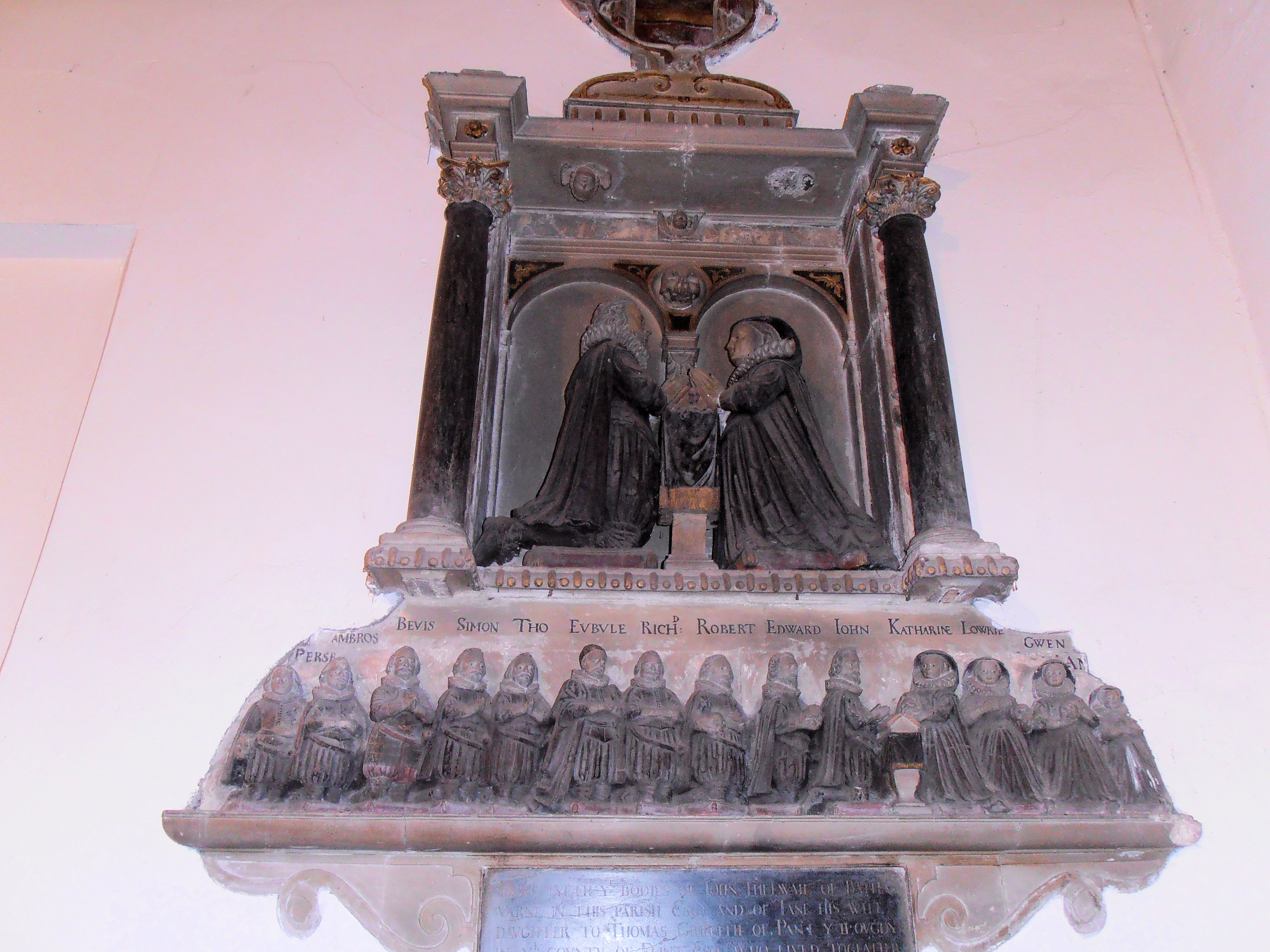
Memorial to John and Jane Thelwall in St Meugan's Church, Llanrhudd, Ruthin, with their children.

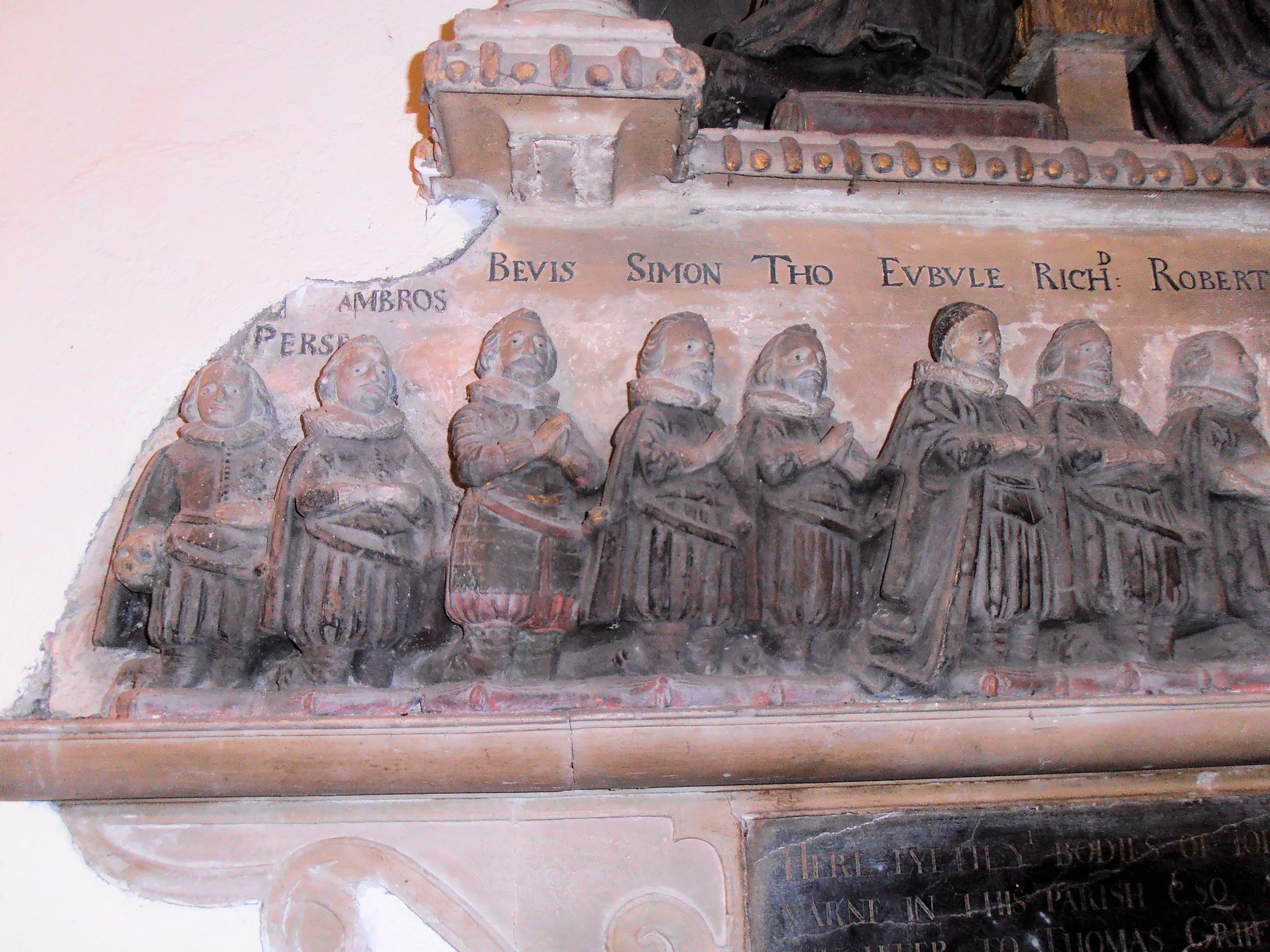
Ambrose, Bevis and Simon

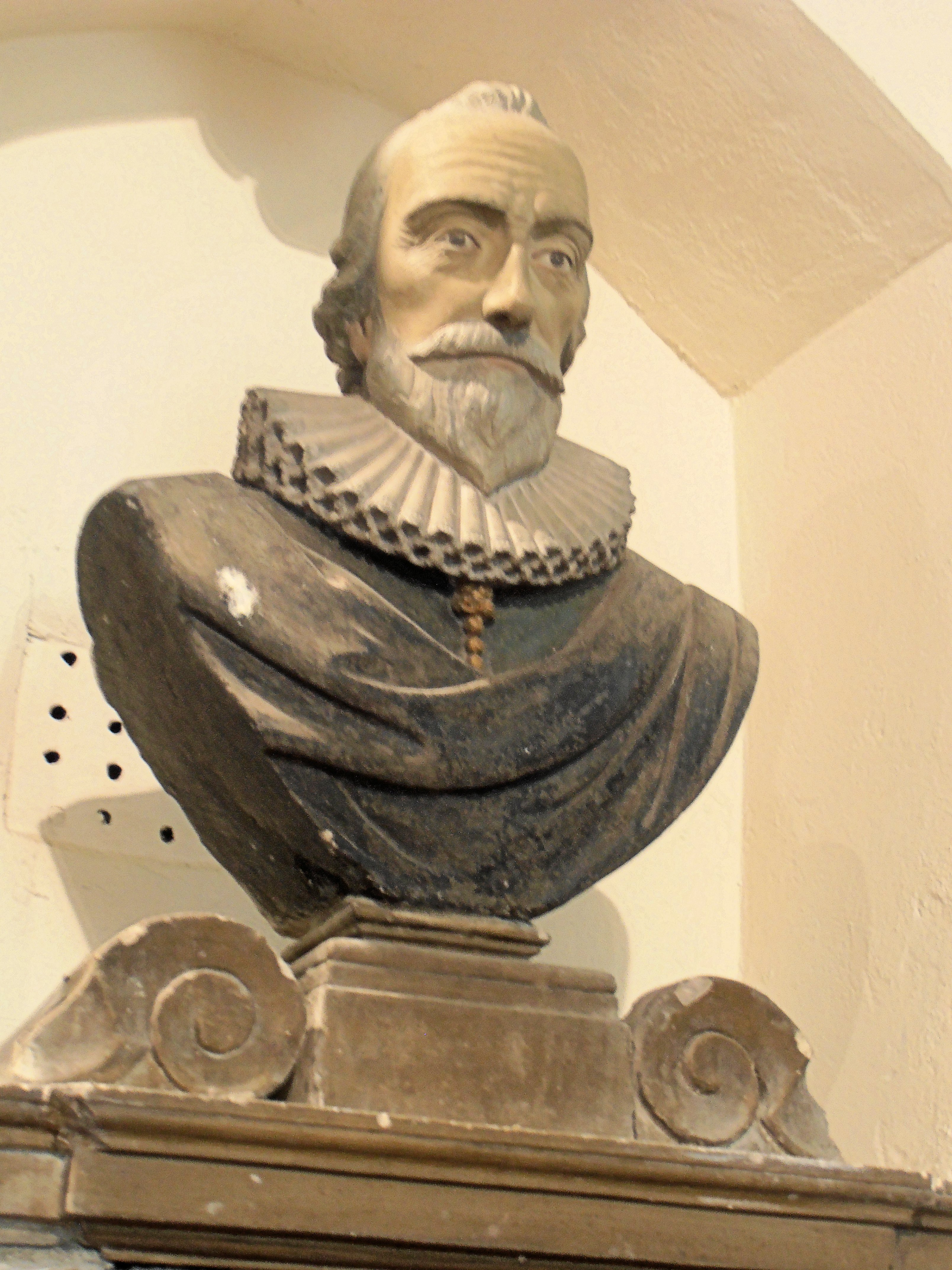
Memorial to Ambrose Thelwall, St Meugan's Church

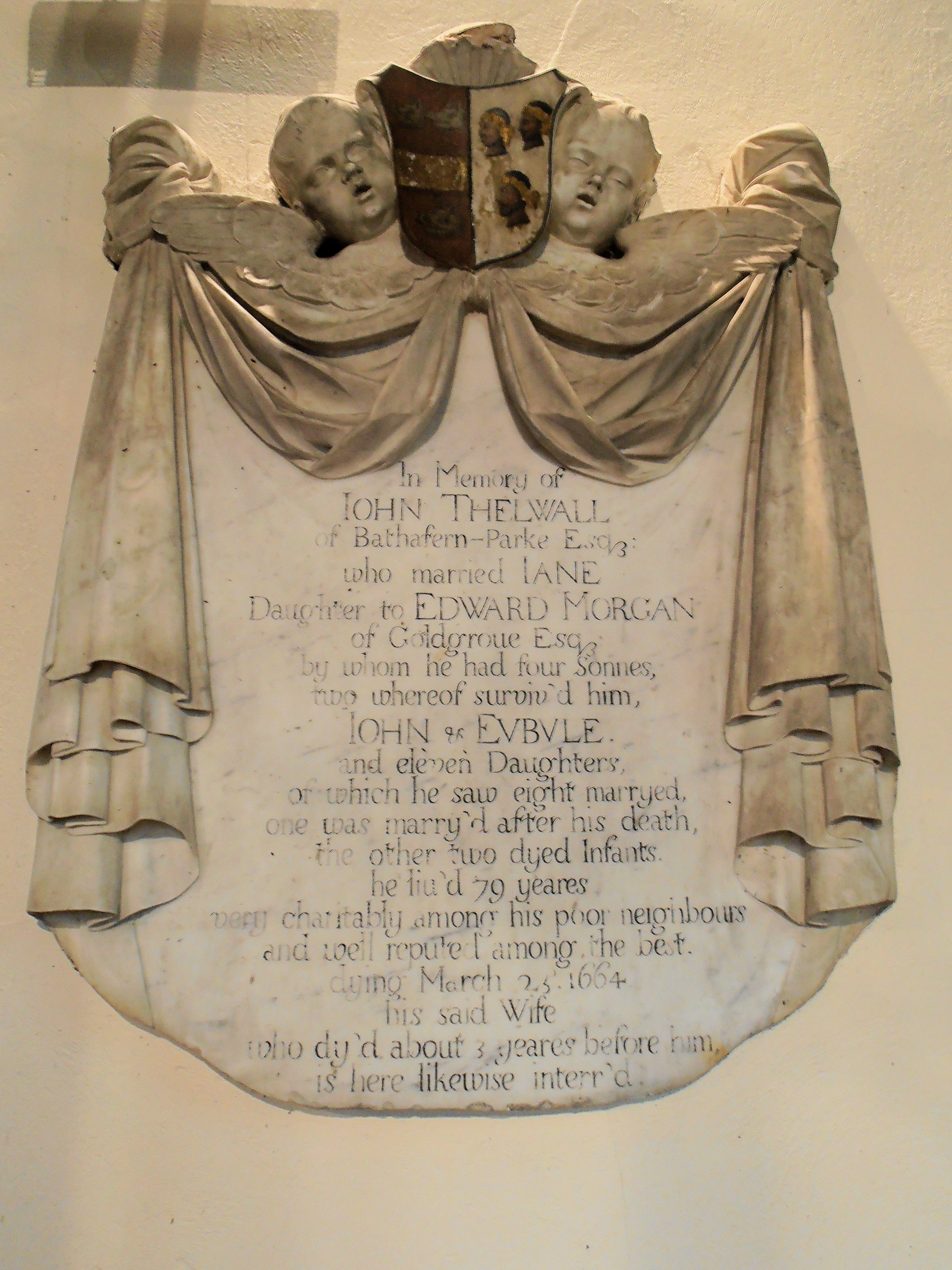
Memorial to John Thelwall (grandson of John who d. 1580), St Meugan's Church, Llanrhudd.

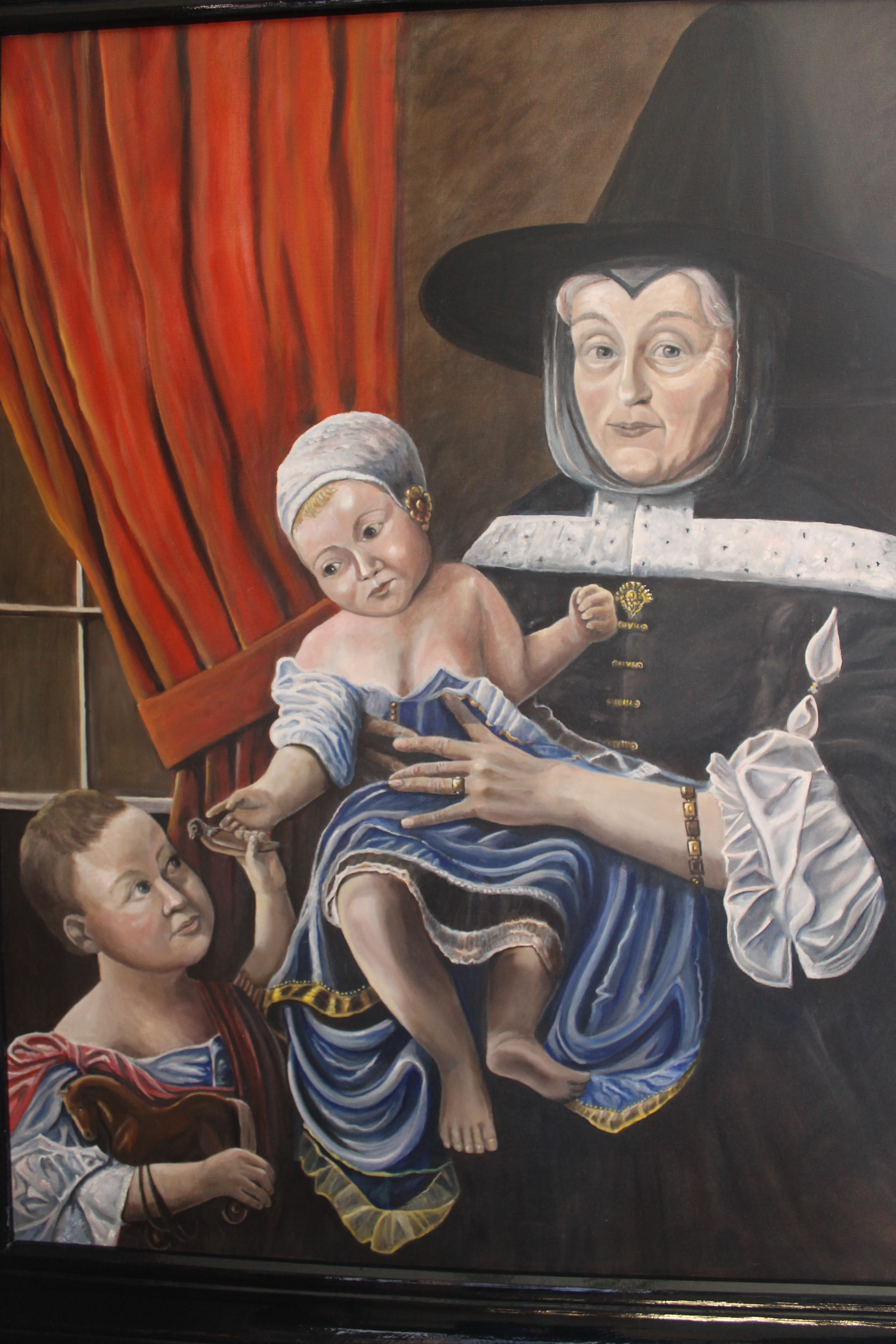
Elizabeth, Eubule's sister at Ebule Thelwall's study at Nantclwyd y Dre, Ruthin.
