= Leyland Arms, Llanelidan =

Building in Denbighshire, Wales

Leyland Arms
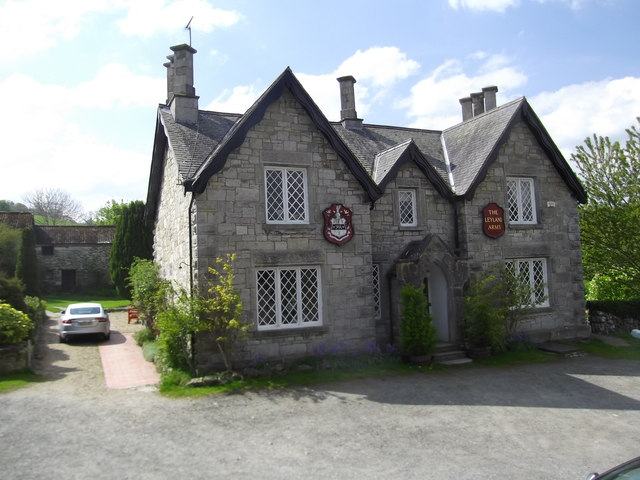

- Location within Wales

General information
- Status: Completed
- Location: Llanelidan, Denbighshire, Wales
- Coordinates: 53.044363°N 3.329501°W

Website
- Cadw

References
- Cadw 1354

The Leyland Arms is a Grade II listed building in the community of Llanelidan near Ruthin, Denbighshire, Wales, which dates back to 1354. It was listed by Cadw (Reference Number 1354).

The Leyland Arms is a country pub. It exists principally to maintain the local community and provide a social hub for the residents of the village. The public house occupies a prime position in the small village of Llanelidan. The entrance to the Leyland Arms can be found through the courtyard behind the main building. Once inside the building there are ceiling beams and a wood-burning fire which together provide a setting that corresponds to the small bar. All the items on the menu are prepared and cooked on the premises by the landlord, with all produce being sourced from local suppliers. Accommodation is also provided.

== Location ==
This building is situated immediately south of St Elidan's church in the village of Llanelidan and just opposite the church. There are garden walls to right incorporating a number of perforated stone grilles; there are converted cottage and farm buildings to the rear.
