= Nantclwyd Hall =

Mansion in Denbighshire, Wales

Coordinates: 53.0567°N 3.3278°W

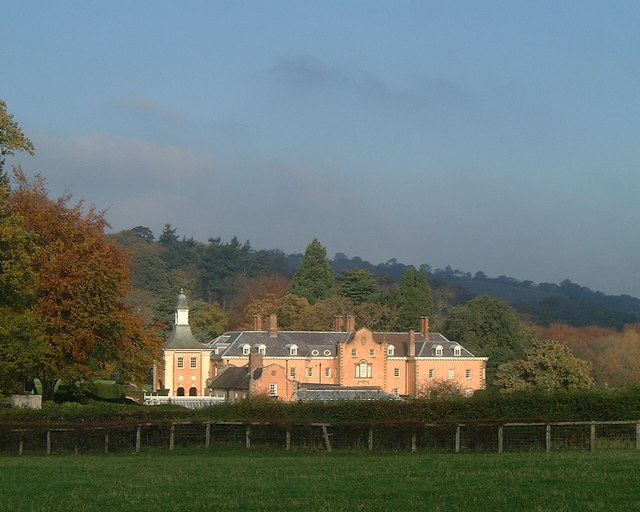
Nantclwyd Hall

Nantclwyd Hall is a 17th-century Grade II* listed mansion near the village of Llanelidan, Denbighshire, Wales, built by the Parry family, and rebuilt by Eubule Thelwall (c. 1622–95) and his wife Mary Parry, the heiress of the estate.

== History ==
=== Thomas Wyn ap John ap Harry and the Parrys ===
Thomas Wynn ap John ap Harry purchased land at Llanelidan (as well as Nantclwyd y Dre) in 1571. He had two sons: Simon, who extended both properties, and Gabriel, who became Headmaster of Ruthin School in 1607. The existing buildings at Nantclwyd Hall originated in the 17th century.

Simon Parry spent a few years as a lawyer in London and bought additional land in Llanelidan in 1603; deeds from this year contain the first mention of "Nantclwyd", the meaning of which is "the brook over the river Clwyd". The word probably referred to the township rather than to a house; the original house was called "Pont-y-gof", which would have been on or near the site of the present Nantclwyd Hall. Simon Parry was the first of the family to copy the English way of using surnames rather than "the son of Harry" ("ap Harry").

He married Jane Thelwall, daughter of John Thelwall of Llanrhydd. At this time he also extended Nantclwyd y Dre by adding a south range to the medieval house, including a parlour, a bedchamber and a two-storey north-west wing, all of which still exist. Their marriage settlement of 1620 mentions the name of their dwelling as being "Plas yn Pont y Go". When Simon died in 1627 the house was passed on to his son William (b. 1605) as his eldest son had been disinherited. An inventory drawn up in this year describes the furnishing in great detail. William followed his father's footsteps, matriculated at Jesus College, Oxford and also became a lawyer in London. He had but one daughter – Mary – and at the death of her father she inherited a thousand-acre estate in and around Llanelidan as well as Nantclwyd y Dre.

=== The Thelwalls ===
Mary Parry married Eubule Thelwall (c. 1622–95) in 1653. The Thelwalls originally came to the Ruthin area from Thelwall in Cheshire and, like the Parry's, were also a family of lawyers. Eubule's great-uncle was Sir Eubule Thelwall (1562–1630) was Principal of Jesus College, Oxford and MP for Denbighshire. As a young man he served in the siege of Denbigh Castle, and was sent by the Governor of the castle (William Salesbury) to Charles I to seek his permission to surrender. He was described as of Gray's Inn in 1659 and living in Nantclwyd, Llanelidan from 1662 onwards. He added land to the estate in 1660s. Eubule had a great interest in gardening, as can be seen in his correspondence with Sir Walter Bagot. His monument in Llanelidan Church lists his eleven children. There is evidence that Eubule and Mary moved to their town house in 1688, when their son (also named Eubule) had come of age. Eubule, like his father, was a very sober lawyer, and a record shows that in 1701 he ordered constables to apprehend those who profaned the Sabbath by dancing, playing bowls or tennis. He married Susan, daughter of Sir Roger Puleston of Emral, Flintshire and when he died in 1713 the main line of the Thelwalls of Nantclwyd ended. The main estate of Nantclwyd was inherited by his daughter, Martha, who married Andrew Kenrick of Cernioge.

== 19th and 20th centuries ==
The house became the country seat of the Naylor-Leyland baronets, being the private residence of Herbert Naylor-Leyland (1864–99), followed by his son Albert Naylor-Leyland, 2nd Baronet (1890–1952).

In 1873, Major Walter Clopton Wingfield (1833–1912) introduced friends at the estate to lawn tennis, calling "Sphairistike". The rules of modern tennis were created there and then.

It later became the residence of Sir Vivyan (or Vyvian) Edward Naylor-Leyland, 3rd Baronet (1924–87), who altered it. He hired architect Clough Williams-Ellis (1883–1978) to reduce the main house in size, removing wings at the rear, adding a new south elevation facing a new formal garden, gates and gazebos on the site of the demolished parts, with a fibreglass temple, stables with a clock tower, a ceremonial arch, a bridge carrying the drive over the river, and a dovecote.

It is currently the residence of Sir Philip Vyvyan Naylor-Leyland, 4th Baronet (born 1953). Sir Philip hired Belinda Eade to create a grotto.

== Architecture ==
Nantclwyd Hall has been listed as Grade II* since July 16, 1966. Additionally, each of the features below is Grade II listed:

- Archway with clock tower at entrance to the service yard
- Bridge on the main drive
- Castellated shooting hide over pond outfall
- East gateway at south perimeter road
- Lakeside rotunda
- Main gateway to the hall
- Office range at south west of the hall
- Stag and hounds sculpture and pedestal on entrance axis to the hall
- Walled garden to the south-east of the hall, with gazebos and pavilions
- West (former main) gates
- West entrance lodge
- West gateway at south perimeter road
