= Henry FitzAlan-Howard, 2nd Viscount FitzAlan of Derwent =

British peer

Henry Edmund FitzAlan-Howard, 2nd Viscount FitzAlan of Derwent OBE (30 October 1883 – 17 May 1962), was a British peer.

== Biography ==
FitzAlan-Howard was the only son of the 1st Viscount FitzAlan of Derwent, second infancy-surviving son of the 14th Duke of Norfolk, and Lady Mary Bertie (1859–1938), daughter of the 7th Earl of Abingdon.

He served as a captain in the First World War and was wounded. After the war he was assistant private secretary from 1921 to 1922 to his father, the last Lord Lieutenant of Ireland. He succeeded to the viscountcy on his father's death in 1947, after which he became heir to the Dukedom of Norfolk, which he was until his own death.

== Marriage and children ==
He was married on 9 May 1922 to Joyce Elizabeth Mary Langdale (born 25 April 1898, died 1995), eldest daughter and heiress of Lt Col Philip Joseph Langdale, OBE, JP, DL, of Houghton Hall, East Riding of Yorkshire. They were divorced in 1955, having had two daughters:

- Hon. Alathea Gwendoline Alys Mary Fitzalan-Howard (born 24 November 1923, died 5 March 2001), married Hon. Edward Frederick Ward, a younger son of William Ward, 2nd Earl of Dudley.
- Hon. Elizabeth Anne Marie Gabrielle Fitzalan-Howard (born 26 January 1934, died 20 March 1997), married Sir Vivyan Edward Naylor-Leyland, 3rd Baronet.

Alathea's wartime diaries were published in 2020 as The Windsor Diaries.

== Death ==
Lord FitzAlan of Derwent died on 17 May 1962, aged 78, at which time the family home was 12 Montagu Square, his taxable estate probated at £81,307 (equivalent to about £1,500,000 in 2025). The viscountcy became extinct on his death.

Peerage of the United Kingdom
| Preceded by Edward FitzAlan-Howard | Viscount FitzAlan of Derwent; 1947–1962 | Extinct |
