= Herbert Naylor-Leyland =

British Army officer and politician (1864–1899)

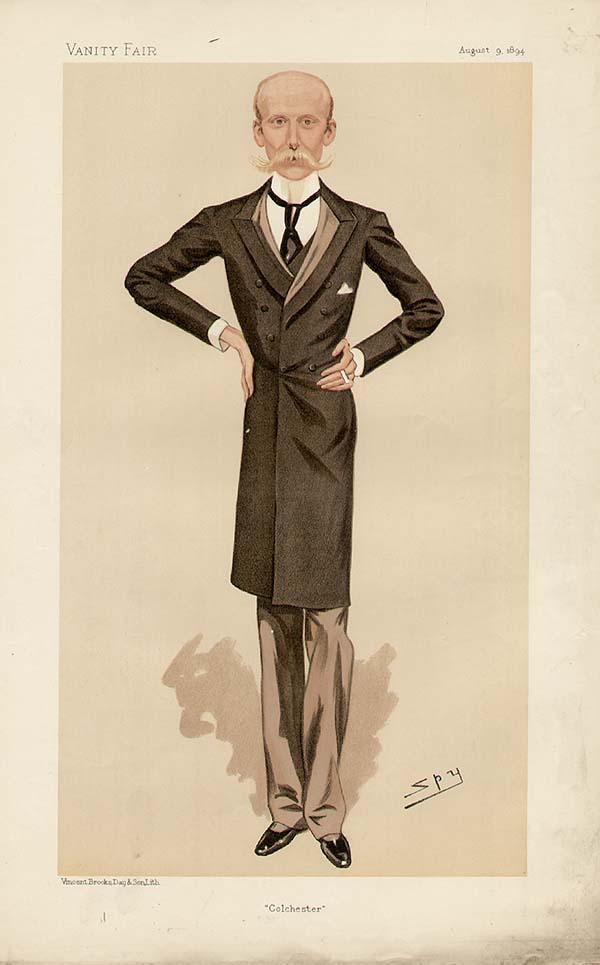
"Colchester". Caricature by Spy published in Vanity Fair in 1894.

Sir Herbert Scarisbrick Naylor-Leyland, 1st Baronet (24 January 1864 – 7 May 1899), was a British politician.

== Biography ==
=== Early life ===
Naylor-Leyland was the only son of Colonel Tom Naylor-Leyland, of Nantclwyd Hall, Ruthin, Denbighshire, by Mary Anne, only daughter of the late Charles Scarisbrick, of Scarisbrick and Wrightington, Lancashire, and was born on 24 January 1864. He was educated at the Royal Military College, Sandhurst, and entered the Second Life Guards in 1882, becoming Captain in 1891. From 1892, he pursued a political career.

=== Career ===
Naylor-Leyland was returned to Parliament for Colchester as a Conservative in 1892, a seat he held until 1895 when he accepted the Chiltern Hundreds. The latter year he was created a Baronet, of Hyde Park House, Albert Gate, in the County of London. He took his title from Hyde Park House (60 Knightsbridge, now the Royal Thames Yacht Club), a mansion built in 1855 for his grandfather, the banker Thomas Leyland, by Thomas Cubitt. He then broke with the Conservatives and joined the Liberal Party (it was said that he was rewarded with a Baronetcy because he changed from being a Conservative to Liberal and voting with the Liberals and winning an important vote), and represented Southport in this party's interest between 1898 and his early death in May 1899 of laryngitis, aged only 35.

=== Personal life ===
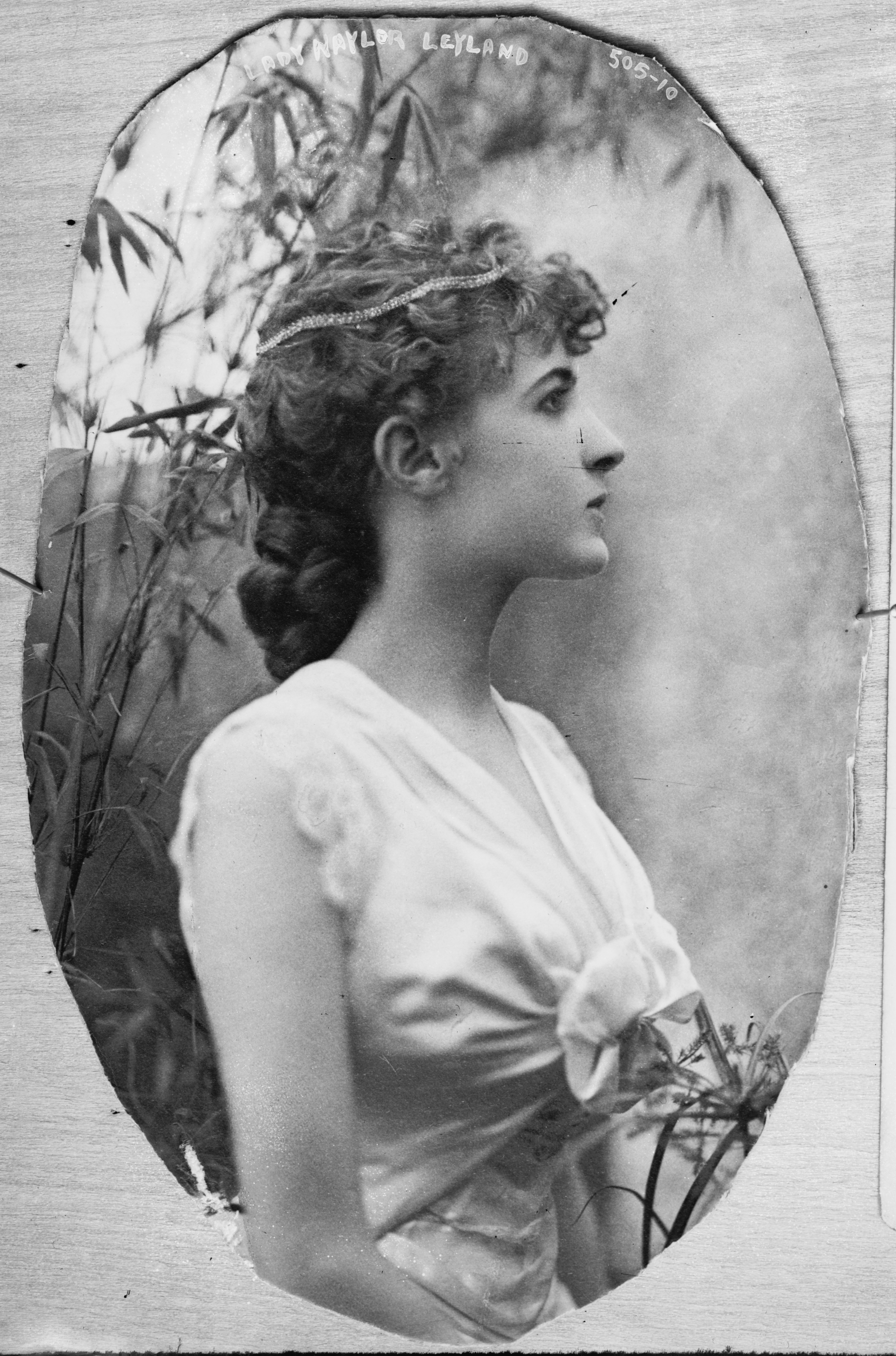
Lady Naylor Leyland

He was married at St George's, Hanover Square, London, on 14 September 1889 (aged 25) to Jeanie Willson Chamberlain (1864–1932), daughter of Mr and Mrs William Selah Chamberlain, of Cleveland, Ohio, USA; they had two sons:

- Albert Edward Herbert Naylor-Leyland (b. 6 December 1890; d. 1952), who succeeded 1899 to his father's baronetcy, aged 8.
- George Vyvyan Naylor-Leyland (b. 1892; killed in action on 21 September 1914, aged 22,), who was educated at Eton.

His wife's beauty and wit reportedly played a major role in her husband's return to politics in 1898. They were part of the Prince of Wales's set, with their town house at 60 Knightsbridge, and their country seat at Lexden Park, Colchester. After Herbert's death, Lady Naylor-Leyland stayed on at the Knightsbridge house until 1923.

== Sources ==
- "Captain Naylor-Leyland dead" (Abstract) (full text) The New York Times, 8 May 1899. Retrieved 8 May 2008.

Parliament of the United Kingdom
Preceded by Lord Brooke	Member of Parliament for Colchester; 1892–1895	Succeeded by Sir Weetman Pearson
Preceded by George Curzon	Member of Parliament for Southport; 1898–1899	Succeeded by Sir George Augustus Pilkington
Baronetage of the United Kingdom
New creation	Baronet (of Hyde Park House); 1895–1899	Succeeded by Albert Naylor-Leyland
