= Llanelidan =

Village in Denbighshire, Wales

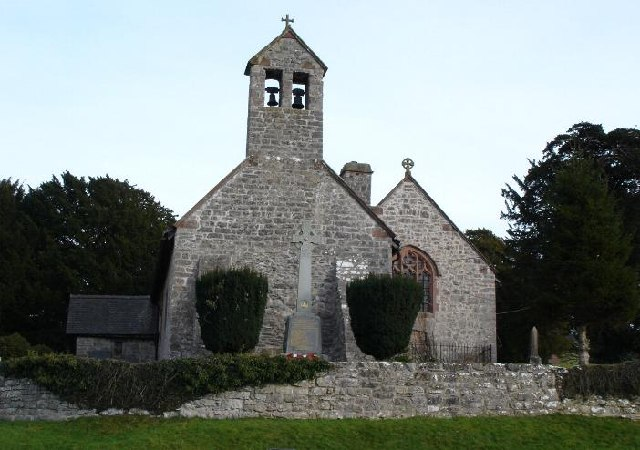
- The church from the main road

- Location within Denbighshire
- Population: 305 (2011)
- OS grid reference: SJ106504
  - Cardiff: 108 mi (174 km)
  - London: 172 mi (277 km)
- Community: Llanelidan
- Principal area: Denbighshire
- Country: Wales
- Sovereign state: United Kingdom
- Post town: RUTHIN
- Postcode district: LL15
- Dialling code: 01824
- Police: North Wales
- Fire: North Wales
- Ambulance: Welsh
- UK Parliament: Clwyd West
- Senedd Cymru – Welsh Parliament: Clwyd East
- List of places UK Wales Denbighshire 53.043°N 3.333°W Map of the community

Llanelidan is a small village and community in the county of Denbighshire in north-east Wales. The community also includes the hamlet of Rhyd-y-Meudwy.

The church, village hall and pub all lie within 200 yards of each other overlooking the village cricket ground Also in the village centre is King George's field, this is land legally protected by the Fields in Trust Charity, and is free for use by anyone. Public space in the village includes the Village Green. This is 3½ acres of registered Village Green, Ancient and semi natural woodland that is a bluebell wood in the spring. It was allotted to be held IN TRUST for the Community of Llanelidan by the Inclosure Awards of 1861 and is for the enjoyment and recreation of members of the Parish. It lies north west of the village along a footpath towards Coed Pen Y Bryn.

== Location ==
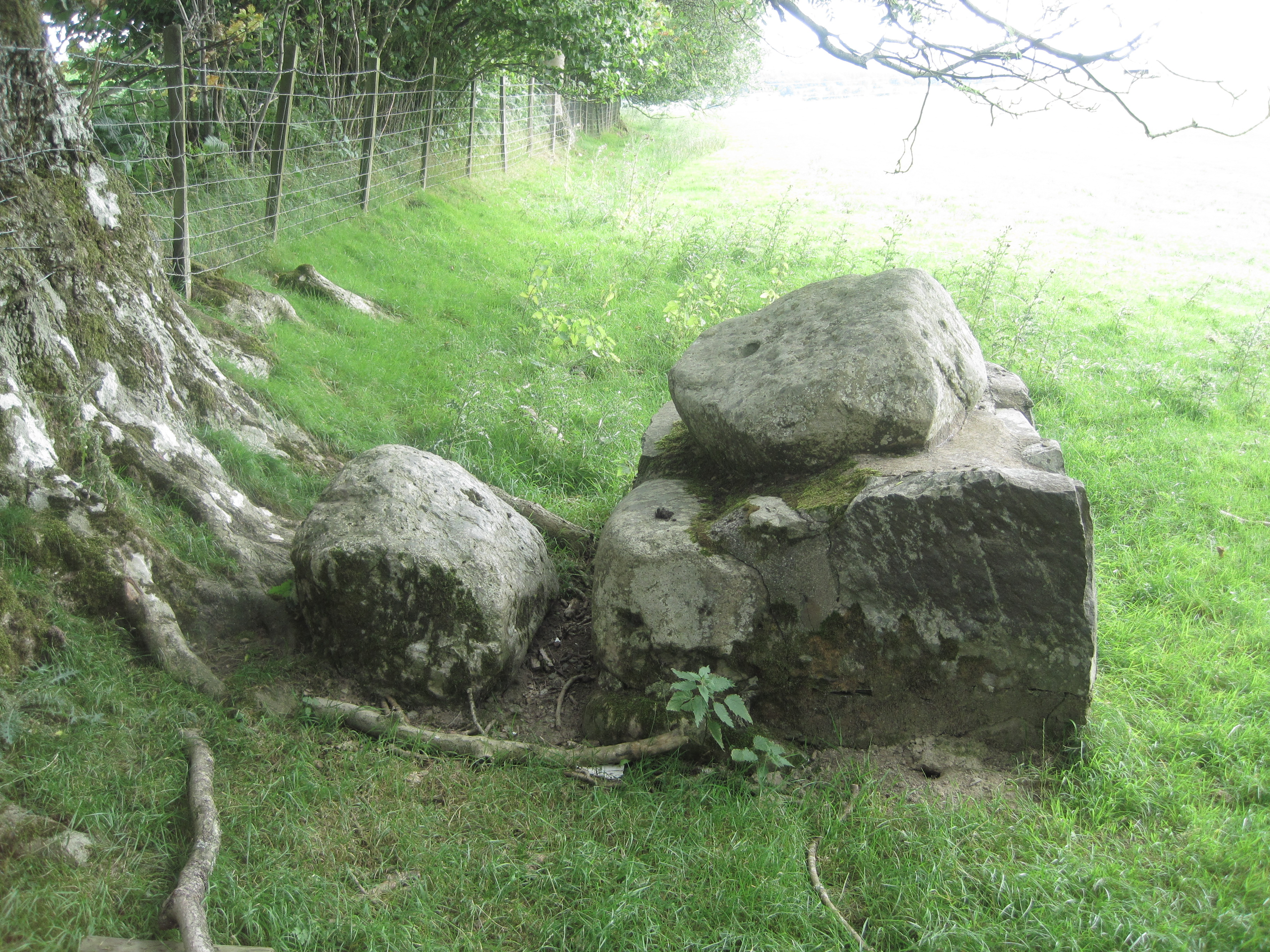
Bwrdd y Tri Arglwydd

The village of Llanelidan is located just off the A494 road between Ruthin and Corwen in the valley of Afon y Maes, a tributary of the Clwyd. The River Clwyd forms part of the western boundary of the community (parish), which extends further east and south of the village, covering much of the area in the triangle formed by the A-roads joining Ruthin, Corwen and Llandegla. The southernmost tip of the community is marked by Bwrdd y Tri Arglwydd (the table of the three lords), an ancient stone monument marking the point where the lordships of Ruthin, Glyndyfrdwy and Yale met. It is currently the meeting point between the communities of Llanelidan, Bryneglwys, Corwen and Gwyddelwern.

== History and amenities ==
=== St Elidan Church ===
Llanelidan is a pretty, scattered hamlet in the green valley of the Afon y Maes, a tributary of the Clwyd. The church - uniquely dedicated to a local saint - stands beside the Leyland Arms public house, surrounded by yews and old Welsh tombstones. Built in the 15th century and ‘double-naved’ in the distinctive local style, it retains many medieval features despite extensive Victorian restoration. There are a pair of barrel-vaulted ‘canopies of honour’ over the altar spaces, fragments of medieval glass - notably the symbols of the crucifixion in blue shields above the altar - and above all a wonderful display of carved woodwork. Sections of the medieval rood screen (which must have been especially fine) are set by the pulpit, including horse-like beasts, intricate roundels, and trails of vines and ivy-berries. The Jacobean pulpit has carvings of its own, with more panels of the same date behind the altar. Old box pews, monuments to successive squires of nearby Nantclwyd Hall, and a touching portrait of the local Roman Catholic martyr Edward Jones are noteworthy.

Church usually open daylight hours. Further information and opening times from Diocesan Office, High Street, St Asaph, LL17 0RD Phone number: 01745 582245

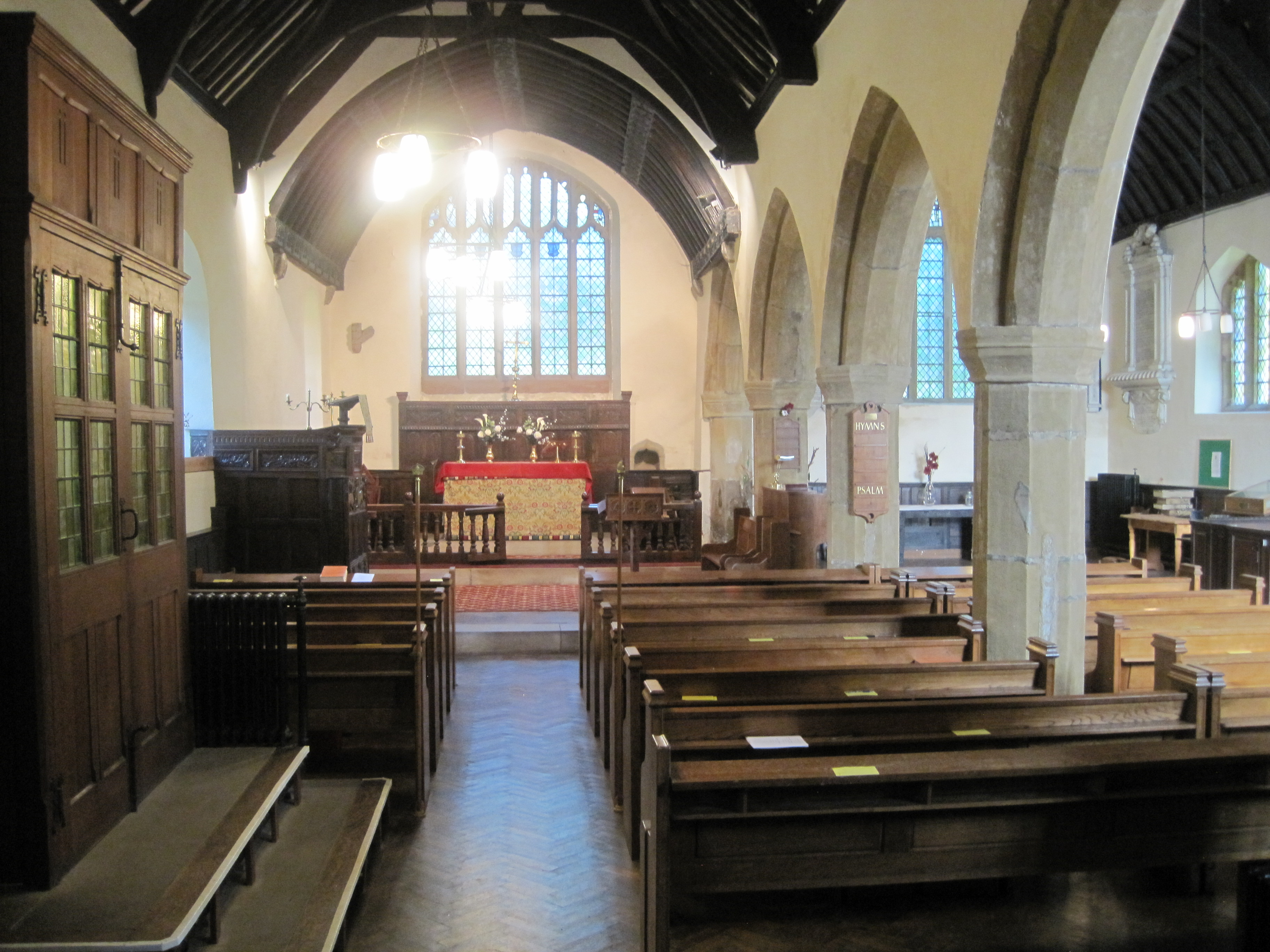
Internal; towards the altar

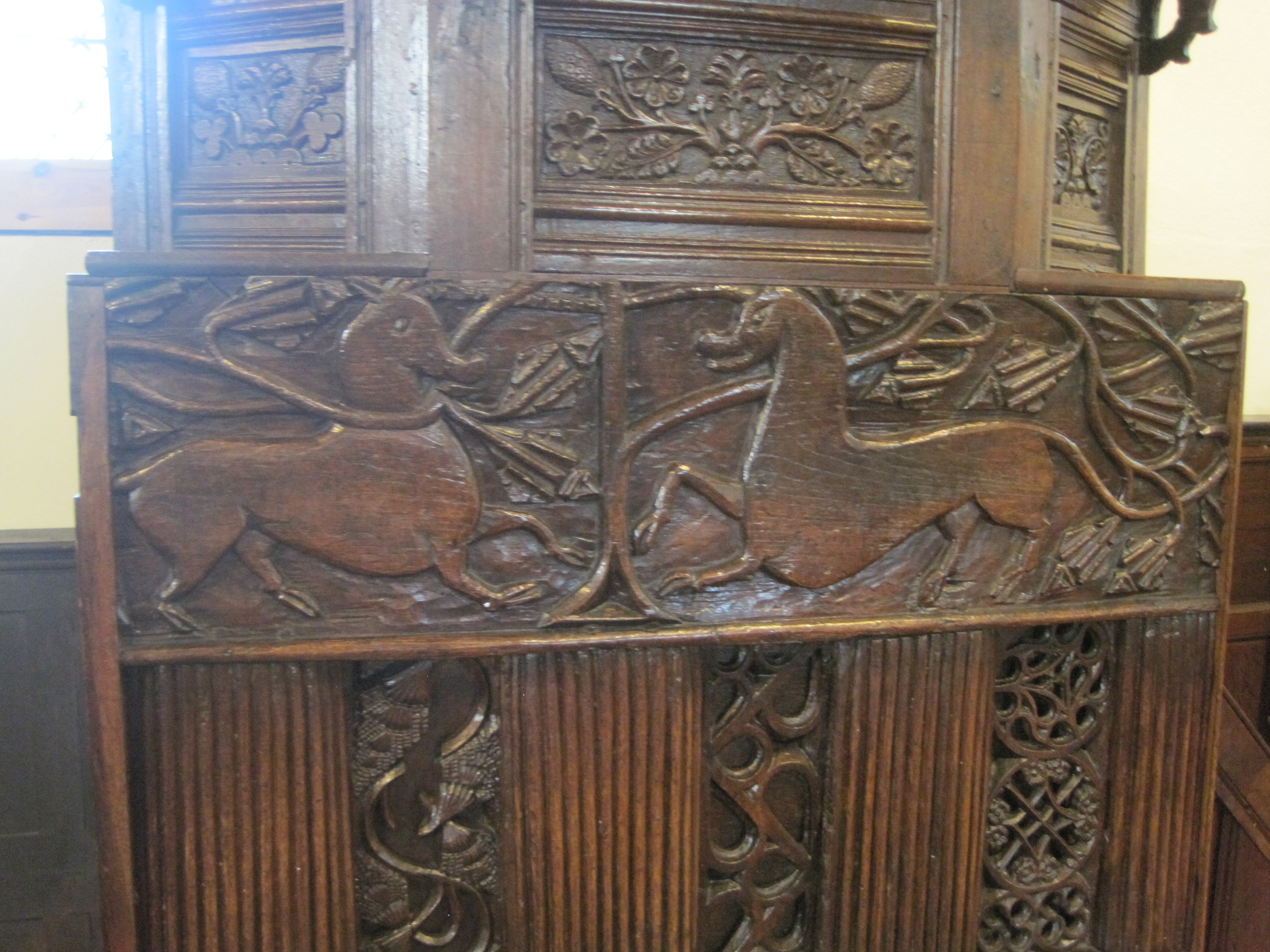
Wood carved pulpit

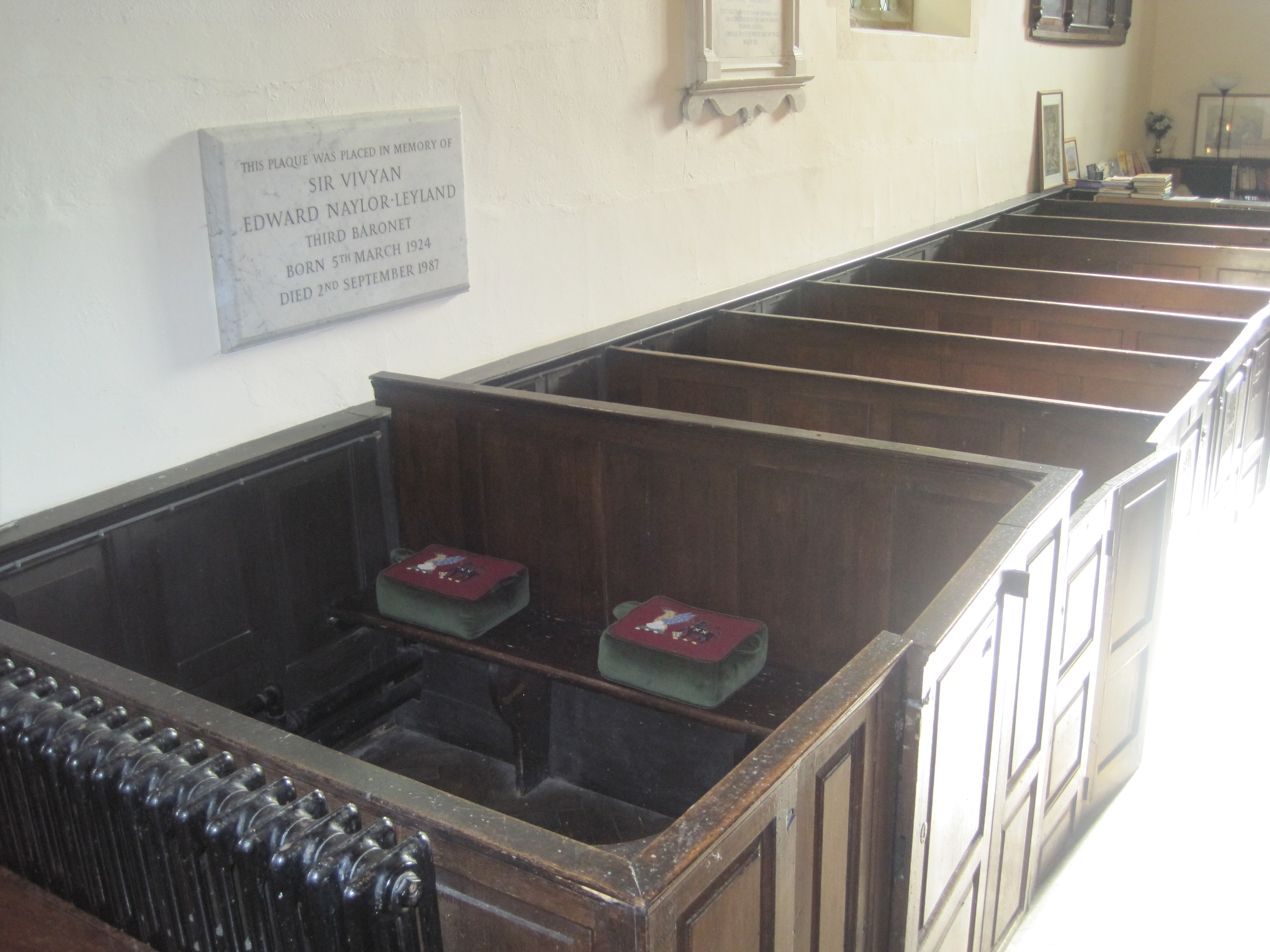
Family pews

=== The village ===
In December 1873, Major Walter Clopton Wingfield designed an early version of lawn tennis — which he called sphairistike (Greek: σφάίρίστική, meaning "skill at playing at ball"), and was soon known simply as "sticky" — for the amusement of his guests at a garden party at Nantclwyd Hall in Llanelidan.

== Llanelidan, the song ==
A song titled Llanelidan has been written, performed and released to a tune composed by Robat Arwyn. The words portray how Llanelidan's strong and active Welsh community became just a memory due to the actions of Sir Vivian Naylor-Leyland, who intentionally burned down many of the homes of the Welsh-speaking locals on his Nantclwyd estate. In the song, Naylor-Leyland is described as a Fascist.

== Notes ==
As of 28 April 2011, this article is derived in whole or in part from medieval-wales.com/index.php. The copyright holder has licensed the content in a manner that permits reuse under CC BY-SA 3.0 and GFDL. All relevant terms must be followed. The original text was at "Llanelidan"
