= Norwood (ward) =

Electoral ward in Merseyside, England

Coordinates: 53.643°N 2.971°W

Norwood is an area and Metropolitan Borough of Sefton ward in the Southport Parliamentary constituency that covers the localities of Blowick and Highpark in the town of Southport.

== Councillors ==
Term	Councillor	Party
2018–Present	Mhairi Doyle	Labour
2019–Present	Greg Steven Myers	Labour
2024–Present	Dave Neary	Labour

Councillors Bill Welsh and Marianne Welsh both left the Liberal Democrats in July 2017. Later that year in September, they both rejoined Sefton Council representing Labour for Norwood ward. In 2019, neither Bill Welsh or Marianne Welsh contested that year's local election. Steven Myers and Carran Janet Waterfield, both Labour candidates, were elected, albeit with a much-reduced majority. In 2024, Carran Janet Waterfield did not stand, the seat was contested and won by Labour candidate Dave Neary. A previous councillor for the ward is Ronnie Fearn, the former Liberal Democrat MP for Southport.

== Election results ==
Councillors are elected every four years. The Metropolitan Borough of Sefton elects a third of there councillors each election therefore there is an election every year apart from the fourth year.

=== Elections of the 2020s ===
Sefton Metropolitan Borough Council Municipal Elections 2024: Norwood
Party	Candidate	Votes	%	±%
Labour	Dave Neary	1487	51	▼8.0
Conservative	Margaret E Middleton	461	17	▲1.0
Liberal Democrats	Lesley Delves	433	16	▼3.0
Green	David McIntosh	306	11	▲5.0
Turnout		2687	26.2	
Labour hold		Swing	▼8.0	

Sefton Metropolitan Borough Council Municipal Elections 2023: Norwood
Party	Candidate	Votes	%	±%
Labour	Greg Myers	1754	59	▲3.0
Liberal Democrats	Jo Barton	551	19	▲4.0
Conservative	Pamela (Pam) Teesdale	465	16	▼6.0
Green	David McIntosh	188	6	▼2.0
Turnout		2958	29	
Labour hold		Swing	▲3.0	

Sefton Metropolitan Borough Council Municipal Elections 2022: Norwood
Party	Candidate	Votes	%	±%
Labour	Mhairi Doyle	1734	56	▲12.0
Conservative	Pam Teesdale	672	22	▼6.0
Liberal Democrats	Stuart Brian Williams	452	15	▼7.0
Green	David McIntosh	244	8	
Turnout				
Labour hold		Swing	▲12.0	

Sefton Metropolitan Borough Council Municipal Elections 2021: Norwood
Party	Candidate	Votes	%	±%
Labour	Carran Janet Waterfield	1326	44	
Conservative	Pam Teesdale	848	28	
Liberal Democrats	Alistair Peter Fleming West	629	21	
Green	David McIntosh	228	8	▲2.0
Turnout				
Labour hold		Swing		

Note: The May 2020 election was postponed due to the COVID-19 pandemic, and was rescheduled in May 2021

=== Elections of the 2010s ===
Sefton Metropolitan Borough Council Municipal Elections 2019: Norwood
Party	Candidate	Votes	%	±%
Labour	Greg Steven Myers	1239	20%	
Labour	Carran Janet Waterfield	1233	20%	
Liberal Democrats	Peter Blake	928	15%	
Liberal Democrats	David Ian Newman	831	13%	
Conservative	Michael James Shaw	460	7%	
UKIP	Peter Noel Gregson	416	7%	
UKIP	Gordon Ferguson	413	7%	
Green	David McIntosh	342	6%	▲3.0
Conservative	Sinclair Thomas	333	5%	
Majority		311	5%	
Majority		402	7%	
Turnout		6195		
Labour gain from Liberal Democrats		Swing		
Labour gain from Liberal Democrats		Swing		

Sefton Metropolitan Borough Council Municipal Elections 2018: Norwood
Party	Candidate	Votes	%	±%
Labour	Mhairi Doyle	1,779	49%	
Liberal Democrats	Peter Blake	1,122	31%	
Conservative	Michael Shaw	506	14%	
Green	David McIntosh	122	3%	
UKIP	Peter Gregson	81	2%	
Majority		657	18%	
Turnout		3610		
Labour gain from Liberal Democrats		Swing		

Sefton Metropolitan Borough Council Municipal Elections 2016: Norwood
Party	Candidate	Votes	%	±%
Liberal Democrats	Bill Welsh	1210	43%	
Labour	Lesley Delves	698	25%	
UKIP	Peter Noel Gregson	417	15%	
Conservative	Poppy Elise Jones	326	12%	
Green	David McIntosh	146	5%	
Majority				
Turnout		2797	29%	
Liberal Democrats hold		Swing		

Sefton Metropolitan Borough Council Municipal Elections 2015: Norwood
Party	Candidate	Votes	%	±%
Liberal Democrats	Marianne Welsh	1971	32%	
Labour	Stephen Jowett	1459	24%	
UKIP	Jeffrey Hughes	1303	21%	
Conservative	Anthony White	1024	17%	
Green	David McIntosh	400	6%	
Majority				
Turnout		6157	62%	
Liberal Democrats hold		Swing		

Sefton Metropolitan Borough Council Municipal Elections 2014: Norwood
Party	Candidate	Votes	%	±%
Liberal Democrats	Daniel Lewis	1085	33%	
UKIP	Jen Davies	739	23%	
Labour	Lesley Delves	604	19%	
Conservative	Graham Campbell	629	18%	
Independent	Jacqueline Barlow	308	10%	
Green	Neville Grundy	176	5%	
Majority				
Turnout		3240	33%	
Liberal Democrats hold		Swing		

Sefton Metropolitan Borough Council Municipal Elections 2012: Norwood
Party	Candidate	Votes	%	±%
Liberal Democrats	Ronnie Fearn	1215	39%	
Labour	Lesley Delves	820	27%	
Independent	Jacqueline Anne Barlow	555	18%	
Conservative	Graham Campbell	343	11%	
Green	Neville David Grundy	147	5%	
Majority				
Turnout		3240	33%	
Liberal Democrats hold		Swing		

Sefton Metropolitan Borough Council Municipal Elections 2011: Norwood
Party	Candidate	Votes	%	±%
Liberal Democrats	Marianne Welsh	1121	32%	
Labour	Michael Nolan	931	26%	
Conservative	Graham Campbell	629	18%	
Independent	Dr Jim Ford	570	16%	
UKIP	Gordon Allan Ferguson	269	8%	
Majority				
Turnout		3520	35%	
Liberal Democrats hold		Swing		

Sefton Metropolitan Borough Council Municipal Elections 2010: Norwood
Party	Candidate	Votes	%	±%
Liberal Democrats	David Sumner	3425	56%	
Conservative	Tony Crabtree	1236	20%	
Labour	Michael Nolan	731	12%	
UKIP	Gordon Allan Ferguson	302	5%	
BNP	Jenny Atherton	204	3%	
Independent	Denise Roney	175	3%	
Majority				
Turnout		6073	60%	
Liberal Democrats hold		Swing		
