= Gordon Banks (disambiguation) =

Gordon Banks (1937–2019) was an English football goalkeeper.

Gordon Banks may also refer to:

- Gordon Banks (musician) (1955–2023), American guitarist, producer and writer
- Gordon Banks (politician) (born 1955), British Labour Party politician
- Gordon Banks (American football) (born 1958), former American football wide receiver
- Matthew Gordon-Banks (born 1961), British Conservative Party politician
