= High Park (disambiguation) =

High Park is a 400 acres (160 ha) park in Toronto, Ontario, Canada dating to the late 1800s. Most of the original park was deeded by John Howard, architect and chief Toronto surveyor.

High Park may also refer to:

- High Park, Edmonton, a neighbourhood of Edmonton, Alberta, Canada
- High Park (federal electoral district), a former federal electoral district in the west end of Toronto, Ontario, Canada
- High Park station, a subway station in Toronto, Ontario, Canada
- High Park, Merseyside, the suburb of the town of Southport, UK
- High Park, Colorado, a region affected by the High Park fire in 2012

== See also ==
- High Park North, a neighbourhood north of the park in Toronto, Ontario, Canada
