= Ronnie Fearn, Baron Fearn =

British politician and life peer (1931–2022)

The Right Honourable The Lord Fearn OBE
- Fearn in 1987

Member of the House of Lords
- Lord Temporal
- Life peerage 11 July 2001 – 11 July 2018

Member of Parliament for Southport
- In office 1 May 1997 – 14 May 2001
- Preceded by: Matthew Banks
- Succeeded by: John Pugh
- In office 11 June 1987 – 16 March 1992
- Preceded by: Ian Percival
- Succeeded by: Matthew Banks

Personal details
- Born: Ronald Cyril Fearn; 6 February 1931 Southport, Lancashire, England
- Died: 24 January 2022 (aged 90) Southport, Merseyside, England
- Party: Liberal (until 1988); Liberal Democrats (1988–2022)
- Spouse: Joyce Fearn
- Relations: Maureen Fearn (sister-in-law)
- Children: Martin Fearn
- Profession: Banker, politician

Ronald Cyril Fearn, Baron Fearn, OBE (6 February 1931 – 24 January 2022) was a British politician who served in both the House of Commons (1987–1992, 1997–2001) and House of Lords (2001–2018). He was a member of the Liberal Democrats, formerly the Liberal Party. Fearn was born and died in Southport.

== Early life ==
Fearn was born in 1931 in Southport, the son of James (a master decorator) and Martha Ellen (née Hodge) Fearn. His birth was registered without his middle name in the Ormskirk registration district of Lancashire. Southport is now part of Merseyside.

Educated at King George V Grammar School, Southport, Fearn was a banker by profession, becoming a Fellow of the Chartered Institute of Bankers. He worked as a banker with Williams Deacons Bank, Williams & Glyn's Bank, and later the Royal Bank of Scotland.

== Political career ==
Fearn was the Liberal and later Liberal Democrat MP for Southport from 1987 to 1992 and 1997 to 2001, after unsuccessfully contesting the seat at the four 1970s general elections. He was the Lib. Dem. spokesman on health and tourism (1988–89), on local government (1989–90), and on transport, housing and tourism (1990–92). In Parliament, he was a member of the Select Committee on Culture, Media and Sport from 1997 to 2001.

Fearn served from 1974 until 2016 as a Sefton Metropolitan Borough councillor, having been a member of its predecessor body, Merseyside County Council. He thus achieved over 50 years of continuous service, being first elected as a Liberal and then for its successor party, the Liberal Democrats. Fearn first contested the borough at the inaugural elections of 1973 as a candidate for the Southport ward of Craven-Sussex-Talbot, in which he topped the poll, receiving more votes than the two other Liberal candidates elected alongside him.

In 1982, Fearn was elected as a Liberal-SDP candidate for the Norwood ward, again topping the poll. In 1990, he was elected for the Social and Liberal Democrats, and four years later, as a Liberal Democrat: the latter party had succeeded those he had previously represented. At every single Sefton election he contested, Fearn was top of the results, including those in which multiple candidates were elected.

He received a life peerage and joined the House of Lords as Baron Fearn, of Southport in the County of Merseyside, in 2001. He retired from the House on 11 July 2018.

== Honours ==
In the 1985 Birthday Honours, Fearn was appointed an Officer of the Order of the British Empire (OBE).

== Personal life ==
In 1955, Fearn married Joyce Edna Dugan; they had a son, Martin, and a daughter. Martin became a mathematics teacher at Cowley International College, St. Helens. Outside of politics, Fearn listed his recreations as badminton, amateur dramatics and athletics. He lived in Southport.

Fearn died in Southport on 24 January 2022, at the age of 90.

Parliament of the United Kingdom
Preceded by Ian Percival	Member of Parliament for Southport; 1987–1992	Succeeded by Matthew Banks
Preceded by Matthew Banks	Member of Parliament for Southport; 1997–2001	Succeeded by John Pugh
