= Robert Hudson, 1st Viscount Hudson =

British Conservative politician (1886–1957)

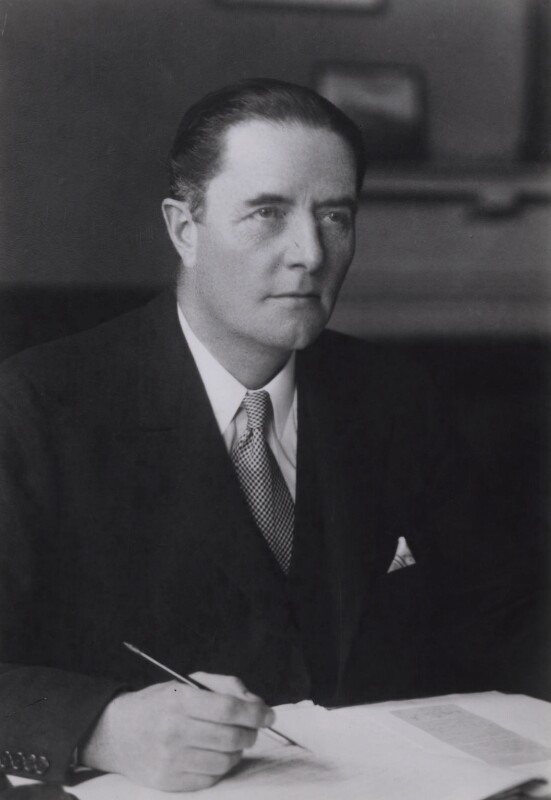
Hudson c. 1927

Robert Spear Hudson, 1st Viscount Hudson, CH, PC (15 August 1886 – 2 February 1957) was a British Conservative Party politician who held a number of ministerial posts during World War II.

== Diplomatic career ==
He was the eldest son of Robert William Hudson, who had inherited and then sold the substantial family soap business, and Gerda Frances Marion Bushell. The wealth he inherited from the soap business ensured that Hudson always had a very privileged and well off existence. Hudson was educated at Eton College and Magdalen College, Oxford. He entered the Diplomatic Service in 1911, becoming an attaché and First Secretary at the British embassy in Washington. Hudson afterwards served as a diplomat in Russia. On 1 December 1918, he married a wealthy American woman, Hannah Randolph of Philadelphia, whom he had met during his time as a diplomat in Washington. He had a particular interest in farming and was a member of the council of the Royal Agricultural Society.

== MP ==
Hudson was elected as Member of Parliament (MP) for Whitehaven in 1924 and served there until losing in 1929. In 1931 he was returned for Southport. He served in several ministerial posts, becoming a Privy Counsellor in 1938. From 1937 to 1940, Hudson served as Secretary for Overseas Trade. Hudson was on the right wing of the Conservative party, being opposed to the "one nation" Conservatives such as Neville Chamberlain. He greatly disliked the coalition National government and frequently advocated that the Conservatives dispose of their Liberal National Party and National Labour allies to create all Tory government. Hudson had a particular dislike of the Liberal National War Secretary Leslie Hore-Belisha whom he intrigued against endlessly as he very much wanted to see Hore-Belisha out of the cabinet. Besides for the coalition National government, Hudson resented the dominance of the "provincial" lawyers and businessmen who made up the majority of the Conservative backbenchers who he felt lacked the necessary vision for Britain's future. The British historian D.C. Watt wrote: "Normally a mere parliamentary undersecretary is the lowest, the most cribbed and confined of political figures, whose role is merely to deputise for his minister in answering the less controversial of parliamentary questions...But the Department of Overseas Trade...was unique, a hybrid sub-department nominally responsible to, yet in fact independent of, the Board of Trade and the Foreign Office. In practice, this meant that Hudson was his own master".

In the spring and summer of 1938, Hudson was deeply involved in talks for an Anglo-German economic agreement. Hudson was especially concerned with coal, at the time a major industry in Britain. Between 1933 and 1937, Britain's exports of coal had declined by 20%, mostly because of cheaper German coal from Silesia and the Ruhr, which in turn had been possible by generous state subsidies to German coal mining companies. Hudson favored some sort of an agreement to end Anglo-German trade competition, especially regarding coal. Hudson wrote that an Anglo-German coal cartel were created then "if such an agreement emerged it would have great possibilities as a stepping stone to political appeasement".

In October–November 1938, Hudson was involved in renewed talks to improve Anglo-German trade. The main issue in the talks, which broke down, were centered around proposals for joint Anglo-German investment in central Africa. However, the British cabinet, which was starting to become concerned with the increasing German economic domination of eastern Europe, were not willing to accept the German demand that the Balkans and Turkey be assigned to the exclusive economic sphere of influence for the Reich. At the same time, Hudson was the lead British negotiator for the Anglo-American trade agreement of 1938. The purpose of the agreement was to reduce the effects of the long Anglo-American trade war that had been started by the Smoot–Hawley Tariff Act of 1930. The State Department had a strong distrust and dislike of Hudson. Jay Pierrepont Moffat, the chief of the State Department's Western European bureau, wrote that Hudson was "unfriendly to American interests or at least...unwilling to subordinate immediate British interests with a view of obtaining a broader agreement with us in world trade...he has certainly encouraged the Prime Minister to seek cartel agreements with Germany. He is ready to sacrifice people to pounds sterling". In Britain, the Anglo-American trade agreement was felt to be unsatisfactory, but given the tensions in Europe and Asia, the agreement was felt to be necessary in order to improve relations with the United States.

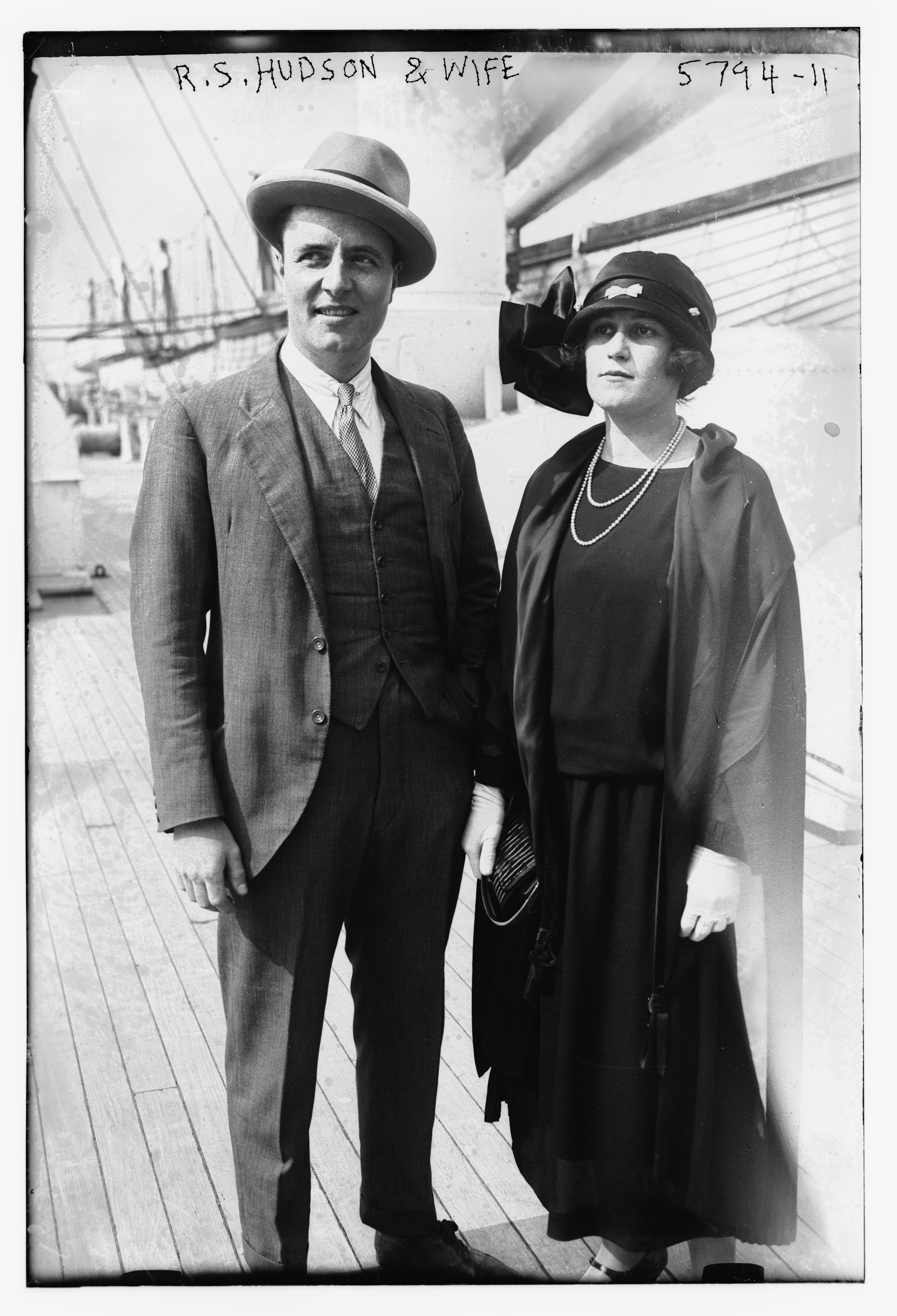
Robert Hudson and his wife Hannah on a vacation, 1922.

Between 15 and 18 November 1938, King Carol II of Romania paid a state visit to Britain. Carol met his cousin, King George VI along with Chamberlain and the Foreign Secretary, Lord Halifax. During his visit, the king warned that Romania was steadily falling into the German economic sphere of influence, and that he wanted British help to keep Romania out of the German sphere. Carol's request for a £30 million loan for Romania was refused by Chamberlain, and all the king obtained was a British promise to buy 200,000 tons of Romanian wheat annually with an option to buy 400,000 more tons of wheat and for an Anglo-Romanian committee to be set up to examine ways to improve Anglo-Romanian trade. Carol's visit led to an extended debate in the House of Commons, during which Hudson broke with the government and spoke in favour of closer economic ties with Romania. Hudson argued along with Oliver Stanley, the President of the Board of Trade, that Britain had a vested interest in keeping the Balkans from falling into the German sphere of influence, and that Britain should have done more to take up Carol's request for closer Anglo-Romanian economic relations. Reflecting both the financial realities imposed by the costs of rearmament and the order of priorities, the Chamberlain government introduced a bill that was signed into law in February 1939 that committed H.M. government to spend over the next year £10 million in government-backed trade credits to subsidise China; £3 million in trade credits for Iraq and Afghanistan; £1 million in trade credits for Portugal and another £1 million in trade credits for Egypt. The largest sum was allocated to China whose economy had been badly strained by the war with Japan. From the British perspective, subsidising China was in their best interest because as long as Japan was bogged down in the war against China, it was less likely that Japan would try to seize Britain's Asian colonies. For the Balkans, £2 million in trade credits were allocated for Greece (the location of Greece aside the main shipping lane to the Suez canal made it crucial from the British viewpoint) and only £1 million in trade credits were allocated for Romania.

== Mission to Moscow ==
In early 1939, it was announced that Hudson would visit Moscow on a high-profile visit to negotiate a trade treaty. At the same time, the government made an effort to improve the often strained Anglo-Soviet relations. In January 1939, Sir William Seeds was appointed the ambassador to Moscow to replace Lord Chilston, becoming the first British ambassador to the Soviet Union who was actually fluent in Russian, which was taken at the time as a sign of a wish to improve Anglo-Soviet relations. At the same time, it was announced that Hudson would visit Moscow. Lord Halifax, a devout Anglican who normally did little to disguise his discomfort with atheist Soviet Russia, had dinner on 20 February 1939 at the Soviet embassy with Ivan Maisky, the Soviet ambassador to the court of St. James's. Halifax-who tended to favor a tougher line with Germany than Chamberlain-told the Cabinet that he "did not want to lose any opportunity of establishing closer relations with Russia". Halifax spoke of "warming up to Russia" and stated that he high hopes that sending the Russian-speaking Hudson to Moscow to negotiate a trade treaty as the best way of effecting that aim. On 1 March 1939, Chamberlain along with four cabinet ministers attended a reception at the Soviet embassy hosted by Maisky to honour the 22nd anniversary of the February revolution of 1917, becong the first time that a prime minister had attended such a reception.

On 8 March 1939, Hudson met with Maisky. Hudson expressed a wish for better Anglo-Soviet relations and assured Maisky that Anglo-German relations were deteriorating. Hudson in his account of his meeting wrote that Maisky had told him that he was "quite convinced that we, the British empire, were unable to stand up against German aggression, even with the assistance of France, unless we had the collaboration and help of Russia". Hudson replied that he did not share that assessment, saying that he believed that Britain and France were capable of defeating Germany on their own and did not need the help of the Soviet Union. Maisky in his account of the meeting stated that Hudson had told him that the Chamberlain had "firmly decided to maintain the empire and its position as a great power". Maisky had Hudson saying that Britain wanted allies and that: "Here in London, however, many people assured him [Hudson] that the USSR now did not want collaboration with the Western democracies, that it is inclined more and more to a policy of isolation, and that therefore it was pointless to seek a common language with Moscow". Maisky wrote that Hudson had told him that his upcoming visit to Moscow was meant to clarify "do we [the Soviets] want or do we not want a rapprochement and collaboration with London". Maisky concluded: "Hence, Hudson's visit to Moscow could play a large role...Personally, Hudson would desire very much that this orientation moved on the line London-Paris-Moscow". Maisky concluded that Hudson was a very ambitious politician who wanted to be prime minister one day, "but I do not think Hudson could take the general line which he developed in today's discussion without the sanction of Chamberlain". Hudson-whom Watt called an "ambitious and driving young Conservative hopeful"-was hoping to achieve some sort of political success during his visit to Moscow that would link better economic relations to closer political ties. Hudson spoke frankly with Sefton Delmer, the foreign correspondent with the Daily Express newspaper about his ambitions to achieve some sort of an agreement in Moscow that would improve his chances of being promoted into the cabinet proper. In March 1939, Hudson was scheduled to visit Germany to discuss improving Anglo-German trade, but in protest against the German violation of the Munich Agreement by occupying the Czech of Czecho-Slovakia on 15 March 1939, the visit was cancelled. Hudson was an appeaser who believed that improving Anglo-German economic relations was the key to saving the peace had very much looking forward to his visit to the Reich.

On 23 March 1939, Hudson arrived in Moscow, ostensibly to negotiate an Anglo-Soviet trade treaty, but in fact to seek to improve Anglo-Soviet relations in light of the Danzig crisis. As was usually the case with foreign visitors, Hudson was not allowed to see Joseph Stalin in the Kremlin, and instead negotiated with Maxim Litvinov, the Commissar for Foreign Affairs. Hudson was one of the few ministers in the cabinet who spoke fluent Russian. After meeting him, Litvinov wrote to Stalin: "In view of the rejection of all our previous offers, we have no intention of making any new offers and it is up to others to take the initiative...In particular, we are ready now as we always have been, to co-operate with Britain. We are prepared to look at concrete suggestions". Hudson told Litvinov that the Munich Agreement had occurred because of British rearmament was still not complete, but that Britain was now far more advanced in its rearmament than it been in September 1938 as Hudson stated: "There will not be a second Munich". Litvinov stated that his government had been working for a policy of collective security under the banner of the League of Nations since 1934, and hinted that Stalin was losing interest in this policy. However, Litvinov told Hudson that his government "would be prepared to consult with H.M. Government and other governments regarding all suitable measures of resistance whether diplomatic or military or economic. He made it clear that he had in mind the possibility of resistance by force of arms". Litvinov went on to accuse the French Foreign Minister Georges Bonnet of wanting to leave Eastern Europe into the German sphere of influence as the price of keeping France out of another world war as Litvinov expressed much rage at Bonnet to Hudson.

Hudson's insistence that he was in Moscow primarily to discuss economic matters and his refusal to discuss Litvinov's suggestions of a military alliance doomed his visit to failure. Hudson told Litvinov that he was not convinced that an Anglo-Soviet military alliance was necessary and at one point angered Litvinov when he told him that Britain could do very well without trade with the Soviet Union. Litvinov accused Hudson of being a bully, saying that such threats to cease trade worked with small powers, and that the Soviet Union was a great power. In regard to the trade treaty, Hudson negotiated with Anastas Mikoyan, the Armenian Communist in charge of economic matters under Stalin. As Hudson spoke no Armenian while Mikoyan spoke no English, the two spoke in Russian, their only common language. No agreement was struck as both men sought the best possible economic treaty for their respective nations. Mikoyan mentioned to Hudson that the Soviet Union might be willing to repay the debts owed to British investors that the Soviet regime had rejected in 1918 in return for a "political advantage". Hudson also talked with Vladimir Potemkin, the deputy foreign commissar, where he spoke in general about a wish for an Anglo-French-Soviet alliance meant to deter Germany from choosing war. Hudson told Potemkin the lie that Britain was capable of sending 19 British Army divisions to France at once to face the Wehrmacht (in fact the British Army could only send 2 divisions to France in March 1939).

Potemkin wrote the Hudson mission was a failure because it "began without serious preparations". Potemkin compared Hudson to the character of Khlestakov, the protagonist of The Inspector-General, an 1836 play by Nikolai Gogol. Potemkin wrote that just as Khlestakov was a vain, lightweight man who persuaded people in a provincial Russian town that he was really the dreaded inspector-general of the Emperor Nicholas I whose task was to root all corruption and inefficiency in the Russian empire, only to be finally exposed at the end as the unimportant man that he really was, that likewise Hudson was just a hack politician who had no real authority to say anything important or even interesting on behalf of London who pretended to be someone important. Much to his disappointment, Hudson was not allowed to see Stalin in the Kremlin as he had hoped, and instead had to settle for posing for a photograph with Litvinov, Mikoyan and the premier Vyacheslav Molotov. A joint communique to the press had prepared which mentioned that Hudson had discussed political and economic matters, but which Foreign Secretary, Lord Halifax. vetoed at the last moment for having mentioned political discussions, which he felt would strain relations with Germany. The communique was released anyhow, but the effort of Sir William Seeds, the British ambassador in Moscow, to prevent the communique from being released caused much ill-will in Moscow, where it was seen as a sign that Britain did not want better relations with the Soviet Union.

Upon his return to London, Hudson offered a bleak assessment of the Soviet Union in a memo dated 4 April 1939 to Lord Halifax Hudson wrote that "except where those [Soviet] interests happen to coincide with ours, that they are likely a Government to prove an unreliable ally". Through not an expert in military matters, Hudson stated that he talked at length with the British military, air and naval attaches at the embassy in Moscow whose unanimous opinion was that the Soviet Union had an abysmally weak military and that "the Russians would be unable to wage an offensive without the regime breaking down". Hudson criticised the plans for better Anglo-Soviet relations to create a counterweight to Germany as unfeasible, which led him to argue that appeasement of the Reich was the only realistic solution to the present problems in Europe.

== The Danzig crisis ==
On 17 July 1939, Helmuth Wohlthat, Hermann Göring's right-hand man in the Four Year Plan organisation, visited London to attend the meeting of the International Whaling Conference as part of the German delegation. The next day, he and the German ambassador Herbert von Dirksen met Sir Horace Wilson, the Chief Industrial Adviser to the Government and one of the closest friends of Neville Chamberlain to discuss the Danzig crisis. Wohlthat's presence in London as part of the International Whaling Conference was merely a cover to meet Wilson, a civil servant widely acknowledged to have the power to discuss confidential matters on behalf of Chamberlain. Misled by the reports of Sir Nevile Henderson, the British ambassador in Berlin, who considered Göring to be his best friend, Chamberlain and the rest of his cabinet had invested much hope that Göring was the principal "moderate" Nazi leader who could restrain Hitler. The Wilson-Wohlthat meetings in London in London were intended to open a back channel between the Chamberlain government and Göring as Henderson was having some difficulty in seeing the Reichmarshal during the crisis. Hudson attended the meetings as an aide to Wilson.

On 20 July 1939, Hudson visited the German embassy to meet Dirksen and Wohlthat, acting on his own. Hudson, an extremely ambitious man who loved intrigue, was hoping to score a great success that would help his otherwise stalled career. Hudson kept detailed notes of his meeting at the German embassy with Wohlthat and Dirksen, where accordingly to him, he proposed a solution to the Danzig crisis. Hudson's notes have him saying that in exchange for a German promise not to invade Poland and ending the Anglo-German arms race, there would be a plan for the industrialists running the heavy industry of Germany, Britain and the United States to work together in a consortium for the economic development of China, Eastern Europe and Africa; of a loan in sum of hundreds of millions for Germany to be floated in the City and on Wall Street; and some sort of plan for the "international governance" of Africa, by which he meant that Germany would given a role in the ruling of the African colonies of the European nations. At the time, it was widely accepted that colonies in Africa were necessary to allow the economies of European nations to function, and a major theme of Nazi propaganda was that it was "unjust" that the Treaty of Versailles had deprived the Reich of its African colonies. The repeated German demands for the return of the former German African colonies were a major issue in Anglo-German relations as the British government had no intention of returning the former German colonies. Wohlthat's account of the meeting had Hudson offering a British loan to the Reichsbank, a debt settlement for Germany, and a resolution of the question of the undervalued Reichmark versus the British pound sterling, none of which appears in Hudson's account of the meeting. Hudson ended his account by saying that if only Hitler would just learn to think in economic terms that much was possible.

After his meeting at the German embassy, Hudson was by all accounts in a state of euphoria, and he asked a group of journalists to come to his house to tell them "off-the-record" about what he had done. A preening Hudson-who believed that he had more or less single-handedly saved the world from the threat of another world war with his visit to the German Embassy-showed his notes of his visit to the embassy to the journalists, telling them it was he who just ended the Danzig crisis with his bold proposals for Anglo-German economic co-operation as Wohlthat was definitely interested in what he had to say. Hudson asked the journalists not to publish this story yet, saying more time was needed for his plan to work as Wohlthat had to return to Germany to report on his offer to Göring, who presumably would convince Hitler to accept it. Two of the journalists present took the view that this was not "off-the-record" and decided to publish the story. Hudson who was described by another Conservative MP as "looks as through he just inherited a fortune and has been celebrating in a hot bath" boasted much about what he just done at a dinner party, speaking very loudly about his "peace-saving" plan.

On 22 July 1939, The Daily Telegraph and the News Chronicle both broke the story on their front-pages that Britain just had offered Germany a loan worth hundreds of millions of pound sterling in exchange for not attacking Poland. The public reaction to this story was highly negative with much of the press calling Hudson's proposed loan "Danegeld". In order to stop the raids of the Vikings, the kings of England had paid the "Danegeld" ("Dane money") to bribe the Danes not to attack. The term "paying the Danegeld" in England implies weakness and cowardice, that someone would rather bribe an enemy rather than stand up for himself, not the least because the Vikings would sometimes attack England even after the Danegeld had been paid. Hudson's offer of a loan to the Reich was felt to be rewarding Germany for threatening Poland, hence the "paying the Danegeld" references to his plan. Much to Hudson's humiliation, Chamberlain told the House of Commons that no such loan was being considered and that Hudson was speaking for himself. Chamberlain labelled Hudson in a letter to his sister a "conceited" junior minister "with a very bad reputation as a disloyal colleague who is always trying to advance his own interests". However, in the same letter Chamberlain wrote Hudson had a tendency "to take ideas on which other people have been working on for years and put them forward as his own". Chamberlain wrote that all of Hudson's ideas put forward to Wohlthat except for the loan offer were those that his government had been considering for the last two years. Chamberlain noted that the plan for the "international governance" of the African colonies of the European nations as a compromise solution for the Nazi demand for the restoration of the lost German colonial empire in Africa that Hudson mentioned had already been offered to Hitler by Henderson at a meeting at the Reich Chancellery on 9 March 1938. The British offer had been rejected as Hitler insisted that he wanted all of the former German African colonies to "go home to the Reich" at once without preconditions.

The Hudson loan offer proved to be greatly damaging to the image of the Chamberlain government both at home and abroad, especially when it emerged that Wilson had met in secret with Wohlthat, which gave the Hudson-Wohlthat meeting a "demi-semi-official air" as Chamberlain put it. Chamberlain wrote in a letter to his sister about the Hudson affair "all the busybodies in London, Paris, and Burgos have put two & two together and triumphantly made five". However, Hudson was able to sell exclusive to the Daily Express newspaper owned by Lord Beaverbrook his account of the loan talks, which were published under the title: "I Planned the Peace Loan to Germany". Gladwyn Jebb, the private secretary to Sir Alexander Cadogan, the Permanent Undersecretary at the Foreign Office, wrote in a furious memo that Hudson's loan offer was "super-appeasement" as he declared that the publication of the plan: "would arose all the suspicions of the Bolsheviks, dishearten the Poles, and encourage the Germans into thinking that we are prepared to buy peace...I must say I doubt whatever such folly could be pushed to a further extreme".

Hudson's meeting with Wohlthat did much damage to the image of the Chamberlain government in Moscow as the Soviet government did not believe that Hudson was acting on his own. At the time, Britain was along with France engaged in talks with the Soviet Union for a "peace front" to deter Germany from invading Poland. The fact that Hudson mentioned that the loan to Germany was to be floated in the City and on Wall Street along with an Anglo-American-German industrial consortium created the impression in Moscow of an Anglo-American capitalist conspiracy to buy off Germany at the expense of the Soviet Union. At the same time, Chamberlain had decided to end the Tientsin incident in China by seeking a compromise solution with Japan instead of executing the Singapore strategy. Through the decision to not execute the Singapore strategy was taken because of the Danzig crisis, Soviet diplomats accused Chamberlain of a "capitulation" to Japan. Jakob Suritz, the Soviet ambassador in Paris, reported to Moscow that while France might be a worthwhile Soviet ally, but not Great Britain as he wrote that the Hudson affair and the Chamberlain's "capitulation" to end the Tientsin crisis proved that the British were not to be trusted. Maisky was not as extreme as Suritz in his reports to Moscow, but Maisky's tendency to put the worst possible gloss on everything Chamberlain did and said gave substance to Suritz's charges. Both the Hudson affair and the Tientsin crisis gave the impression in Moscow that the Chamberlain government was not to be trusted, that Chamberlain would rather make a deal with the Axis powers such as Japan and Germany instead of opposing them. Émile Naggiar, the French ambassador in Moscow, in a dispatch to Paris reported that based on his contacts in the Narkomindel that there was "a recrudescence of lack of confidence in Neville Chamberlain's intentions" in Moscow. The feeling that the United Kingdom was not to be trusted led Joseph Stalin to place more interest in the alternative diplomatic strategy of seeking an understanding with Germany at the expense of Poland.

Despite the humiliation, Hudson remained convinced that "another Munich" to save the peace was still possible under which the Free City of Danzig (modern Gdańsk) would "go home to the Reich" in exchange for Germany not invading Poland. Hudson kept saying that all he needed was "a little more time" to save the peace. Hudson was unaware of the Y-day for the beginning of Fall Weiss ("Case White"), the codename for the invasion of Poland, had been set for 26 August 1939 (later pushed back to 1 September 1939), and that time to save the peace was rapidly running out as Y-day approached. Watt described Hudson as an opportunist who altered between supporting vs. opposing appeasement depending upon what option he felt was best for his career. Watt wrote that Hudson engaged in "criminal pieces of freelancing" in diplomacy that did much damage to Britain's reputation during the Danzig crisis.

Watt argued that Hudson along with the other amateur diplomats in the Danzig crisis such as the Australian pilot and MI6 spy, Sidney Cotton; the professional pacifist Corder Catchpool; the German Rhodes scholar and diplomat Adam von Trott zu Solz; the "press lord" Lord Kemsley; Helmut Wohlthat; the civil servant Sir Joseph Ball; and the Kordt brothers, Erich and Theo, all "...combined to create and confuse the efforts made by Chamberlain and Halifax to convince Britain's potential allies and enemies alike that Munich would not be repeated; that this time they and their country were resolved. That resolve was an essential element in their strategy to preserve peace". Watt maintained that the Kordt brothers, Wohlthat, and Trott all gave British officials a highly misleading picture of the political situation in Germany and seriously downplayed Hitler's intention to invade Poland while Hudson, Catchpool, Ball, Lord Kemsley, and Cotton in their turn made it seem to the Germans that a deal was possible under which Britain would abandon the "guarantee" to defend Poland. Watt noted the German amateur diplomats gave British decision-makers the misconception that Danzig was the main issue in the crisis and promoted the thesis that Hitler was merely considering invading Poland if Danzig was not returned to Germany while in fact Hitler had firmly decided on war against Poland. Likewise, the British amateur diplomats gave German decision-makers the impression that Britain would not go to war for Poland and that Britain was very open for a deal to leave Poland to its fate. Watt argued that Hudson was one of the more pernicious of the "interlopers in diplomacy" as he gave the impression to Hitler that Britain was prepared to buy peace in the Danzig crisis while also giving the impression to Stalin that Britain was engaged in secret talks with Germany against the Soviet Union during the tense talks for the "peace front" meant to deter Germany from invading Poland.

== Minister ==
In April 1940, Hudson was briefly appointed the Minister of Shipping, before on 14 May becoming Minister of Agriculture and Fisheries, in the Churchill war ministry, a post he would hold until the 1945 election. In the opinion of Edward Turnour, 6th Earl Winterton, Hudson "was by far the best of Ministers of Agriculture in either war...he was determined to see that farmers and landowners alike utilised every acre of soil to help keep the nation from starvation". Churchill was dissatisfied with the current agriculture minister, Reginald Dorman-Smith, who was very close to the farmers' lobby, and replaced him with Hudson, who was an advocate of a "scientific" approach to agriculture. Hudson favoured using the latest scientific methods to improve agricultural productivity with no regard for traditional farming methods, an approach that Dorman-Smith was opposed to. Hudson, besides for his advocacy of a "scientific" approach, also favoured a "nutritional" approach under enough food which would be produced to supply essential nutrition an that Dorman-Smith opposed. Dorman-Smith had once been the president of the National Farmers Union, and in common with many British farmers resented the idea of university-educated experts telling farmers how to best manage their farms. Dorman-Smith disliked the "nutritional" approach, saying "once we fall into the nutrition trap we are sunk". For an example, Dorman-Smith was opposed to pasteurised milk under the grounds that British people had drunk unpasteurised milk for thousands of years, and he saw no reason for any change. In the winter of 1939–1940, Dorman-Smith had "different conclusions" about agriculture with Winston Churchill, who was serving as the First Lord of Admiralty, and upon becoming prime minister on 10 May 1940, Churchill sacked Dorman-Smith on 14 May. Hudson's career had benefitted from his friendship with Robert Boothby who had once served as Churchill's parliamentary secretary and who recommended him as Agriculture minister to Churchill.

A major problem for Britain in World War Two was the number of British people vastly exceeded the agricultural capacity of British farms, which thus required Britain to import food to prevent a famine. In 1938, 70% of all the food consumed in Britain came from abroad while only 30% of the food came from British farms. A major aim for Germany in the Second World just as in the First World War was to have the U-boats sink enough shipping to cut off Britain and induce a famine that would force the British to sue for peace. On 28 June 1940, a Scientific Committee appointed by Hudson recommended "a basal diet" as the "foundation of food policy" in view of the possibility of an U-boat-caused famine. The Committee advised that a diet of 2,000 calories per day for every British person would be sufficient to keep the population alive and allow war production to continue. The "basal diet" advised was a mixture of vegetables (especially potatoes), bread, fats (butter and cooking fats), milk and oatmeal. The "basal diet" that was imposed was made possible by extensive rationing.

As Agriculture minister, Hudson strove to make British farming more productive to make up for the food shortages caused by the U-boat campaign. One of Hudson's first acts as minister was to appoint 12 leading farmers as his personal deputies with each assigned to a particular region of Britain. In a controversial move, Hudson established in June 1940 a private corporation, Fyfield Estates Limited, of which he and his wife were the leading shareholders, which purchased a number of farms across Britain. By 1945, Fyfield Estates owned 2,000 acres of farmland while Hannah Hudson had purchased a farm in Oxfordshire, where her husband was often seen. Presented as a symbol of Hudson's love of agriculture, Fyfield Estates generated controversy as a source of a potential conflict of interest as Hudson was engaged in agriculture while also serving as the minister of agriculture.

In April 1939, Britain had imposed peacetime conscription for the first time ever in British history, and to make up for the farmers conscripted, the Women's Land Army had been created in June 1939. Upon becoming Agriculture Minister, Hudson played a major role in expanding the Women's Land Army to send thousands of "Land Girls" to the countryside to work the farms. Many of the "Land Girls" as women serving in the Women's Land Army were called complained that their efforts were not being taken seriously and that the male civil servants of the Ministry of Agriculture treated them in a very patronising fashion. The stories of the contempt that the "Land Girls" were being shown drove down the number of women willing to join the Women's Land Army. Hudson argued that with many British farmers and farmhands serving in the military that the "Land Girls" were essential to provide the necessary workers to expand the productivity of British agriculture and ordered his civil servants to be more respectful of the "Land Girls".

Besides for the "Land Girls", Hudson had German and Italian POWs; Jewish refugees; serviceman on furlough who had been farmers before the war; conscientious objectors; and volunteers from the cities all put to work on British farms. Hudson especially favoured the use of Italian POWs as rural labourers because many of the many Italian servicemen taken prisoner came from the rural areas of Italy and were experienced farmers. Owing to the disinclination of many Italians to fight for the Fascist regime and serious morale problems in the Italian military, by 1943 British forces had captured over half million Italians, making the Italians easily the largest group of Axis POWs in British custody, vastly outnumbering the German and Japanese POWs. Starting in 1941, Italians captured in the campaigns in North Africa and East Africa were shipped to the United Kingdom to serve as rural labour and by 1944, there were 150,000 Italian POWs working on British farms. Besides the fact that many of the Italian POWs came from rural areas, it was believed by British officials that the Italian POWs were less likely to cause problems with the British rural communities than the German POWs.

In 1941–1942, Hudson was involved in difficult talks with the United States regarding the American demand for the end of the Imperial Preference tariff system and for Britain to commit to signing a trade agreement that would force Britain to buy a certain amount of American wheat annually at a fixed price. Hudson regarded the American advocacy of multilateralism as the basis of the post-war order as "the height of hypocrisy" as he accused the Roosevelt administration of attempting to use the lend-lease military aid as a leverage to impose an unfavourable economic agreement that would benefit American farmers at the expense of British farmers. During the war, the U.S. President Franklin D. Roosevelt championed what was known at the time as "economic multilateralism" and is today known as "economic globalisation". As the basis of a post-war economic order, Roosevelt called for the lowering of tariffs, the end of currency exchange regimes, the end of trade quotas and international bodies to arbitrate trade disputes. Roosevelt believed that it was the division into rival economic blocs that were the ultimate cause of both World War One and especially World War Two and that only an "open" economic system uniting the world after the war could prevent another world war. Hudson was one of the leading opponents of "economic multilateralism" in the British cabinet. Hudson maintained that a laissez-faire approach and a free trade system would bankrupt most British farmers who would not be able to compete against a flood of cheap American butter, milk, cheese, beef and wheat pouring into the British market. Hudson argued that a system of tariffs would be needed to ensure the survival of British agriculture after the war. Hudson favoured a system of massive subsidies for British farmers and felt that Britain should sign commodity agreements with nations that were weaker than the United Kingdom, which would allow the British to impose economic agreements that would be at their expense. Along with Lord Beaverbrook, the minister of aircraft production and Leo Amery, the India secretary, Hudson was one the principle advocates in the Churchill cabinet who favoured the continuation of the sterling area and the Imperial preference tariffs after the war as being necessary for the economic "survival" of the United Kingdom as a great power.

Beaverbrook, Hudson and Amery were described by the American historian Randall Woods as "the most strident opponents of multilateralism in all of Britain"-were opposed by another pro-multilateralism group within the cabinet that consisted of Lord Cherwell, Sir Richard Law and Sir John Anderson. The protectionist, sterling area approach favoured by Hudson, Beaverbrook and Amery who argued that bilateral trade agreements would be "self-righting" met with much criticism from the economist John Maynard Keynes who serving as a senior civil servant with the Treasury. Keynes wrote: "You exaggerate the extent to which payments agreements are, as such, self-righting or productive of autonomic equilibrium. In the absence of government trading both ways, it is far from the case of being self-righting. For one thing, the initiative to make them lies with the creditor rather than with the debtor country, yet the potential importers and creditor country have no particular motive to discriminate in favour of the goods of the debtor country". Keynes used as an example the Anglo-Argentine economic agreement of 1933 which increased the exports of Argentine beef and wheat to Britain and led to Argentina being awash in pound sterling, but did not led to Argentines importing more British cotton and textiles as the supporters of the agreement had hoped it would. Keynes admitted that economic multilateralism presented problems for Britain, but he argued that it would be a better economic system after the war than the approach advocated by Beaverbrook, Hudson and Amery.

In April 1942, Hudson purchased Manor Farm in Manningford from George Odlum. Odlum, a leading Canadian agricultural expert had played a key role in developing the tobacco industry in Southern Rhodesia (modern Zimbabwe) for the British South Africa Company, and then worked in Honduras and Kenya as a plantation manager. Odlum had brought the farm in 1926, where he became renowned for his "scientific" farming as he sought to use the latest methods to improve crop yields and produce cattle whose milk was disease-free. In August 1943, a team of 26 journalists visited Manor Farm and were told that the farm was in a "very poor condition" when Hudson had purchased it the previous year, and the current flourishing state of the farm was all the work of "farmer Hudson". Odlum at first threatened to sue for libel unless the offending statement about the farm being "in a very poor condition" at the time that Hudson brought it, which appeared in a number of British newspapers, was withdrawn. Odlum had won several awards for his efficiency as a farmer, and felt that the statement that Manor Farm being in a "very poor condition" suggested that the modern farming techniques being employed were all the work of Hudson. When the statement was not withdrawn, Odlum sued Hudson for libel in February 1944.

In 1943, Hudson's work together with Lord Woolton and Lord Leathers was lauded by the Canadian journalist Robert Thurlow as a "success story". Thurlow wrote: "This is the story of three men who supply, and operate, what is probably the world's biggest store". From 1939 to 1943, the amount of arable acreage in Britain increased from 12 million acres to 18 million acres. More importantly, by 1943, 60% of the food consumed in the United Kingdom came from British farms, which lessened the dependence on imported food while freeing up shipping to bring in other supplies.

== The Odlum libel suit ==
The libel suit that Odlum launched in 1944 finally came to trial on 21 June 1946. Hudson testified at the trial that Manor Farm was indeed in a "very poor condition" when he purchased it in 1942 as he maintained that the farm yields were sub-par and that Odlum had apologised to him in person for his poor farming skills. Odlum by contrast testified that Hudson had expressed much admiration for the condition of the farm when he inspected it before buying the property. Odlum introduced as evidence the bill of sale that showed that Hudson had paid additional £19,000 for the cattle and farm machinery that went with the farm, which contradicted Hudson's account that the farm was derelict and the cattle were understrength. Hudson claimed that he had paid a high price for the farm and only discovered later in 1942 that it was in dismal condition. A key moment occurred when Hudson testified that a potato field on Manor Farm was wasteland when he purchased it, only for Odlum to introduce as evidence a photograph that he had taken of the said field shortly before he sold the farm to Hudson that showed it was already a potato field. The evidence in favour of Odlum was overwhelming and he won the case, being awarded £500 for the damage done to his reputation by Hudson. The Hudson-Odlum libel trial attracted much media attention, and the verdict in favour of Odlum is generally believed to have effectively finished Hudson's political career.

Hudson was named Viscount Hudson in 1952.

== Sources ==
- Bouverie, Tim (2020). Appeasement: Chamberlain, Hitler, Churchill, and the Road to War. London: Crown. ISBN 9780451499851.
- Carley, Michael Jabara (1999). 1939: The Alliance That Never Was and the Coming of World War II. Chicago: Ivan R. Dee. ISBN 9781461699385.
- Crowson, N.J. (2010). Britain and Europe: a Political History since 1918. London: Taylor & Francis. ISBN 9781136891984.
- McDonough, Frank (1998). Neville Chamberlain, appeasement, and the British road to war. Manchester: Manchester University Press. ISBN 9780719048326.
- Martin, John (April 2007). "George Odlum, the Ministry of Agriculture and 'Farmer Hudson'" (PDF). The Agricultural History Review. 55 (2): 229–250. JSTOR 40276166.
- Moore, Robert; Fedorowich, Kent (2002). The British Empire and Its Italian Prisoners of War, 1940–1947. London: Palgrave Macmillan. ISBN 9780230512146.
- Neilson, Keith (2022). The Foreign Office's War, 1939-41 British Strategic Foreign Policy and the Major Neutral Powers. London: Boydell Press. ISBN 9781783277056.
- Peden, Charles (2022). Churchill, Chamberlain and Appeasement. Cambridge: Cambridge University Press. ISBN 9781009201988.
- Self, Robert (2017). Neville Chamberlain: a Biography. London: Taylor & Francis. ISBN 9781351915168.
- Shaw, Louise Grace (2003). The British Political Elite and the Soviet Union, 1937-1939. London: Frank Cass. ISBN 9780714653983.
- Smetana, Vít (2008). In the Shadow of Munich British Policy Towards Czechoslovakia from the Endorsement to the Renunciation of the Munich Agreement (1938-1942). Prague: Charles University Press. ISBN 9788024613734.
- Steiner, Zara (2011). The Triumph of the Dark European International History 1933-1939. Oxford: Oxford University Press. ISBN 9780191613555.
- Twinch, Carol (2021). Women on the Land: Their Story During Two World Wars. London: Lutterworth Press. ISBN 9780718845414.
- Watt, Donald Cameron (1989). How War Came: The Immediate Origins of the Second World War, 1938-1939. London: Heinemann. ISBN 0-434-84216-8.
- Wilt, Alan F. (2001). Food for War: Agriculture and Rearmament in Britain Before the Second World War. Oxford: Oxford University Press. ISBN 9780191543340.
- Woods, Randall (1990). A Changing of the Guard Anglo-American Relations, 1941-1946. Durham: University of North Carolina Press. ISBN 9780807818770.

Parliament of the United Kingdom
Preceded by Thomas Gavan Duffy	Member of Parliament for Whitehaven; 1924 – 1929	Succeeded by M. Philips Price
Preceded by Godfrey Dalrymple-White	Member of Parliament for Southport; 1931 – 1952	Succeeded by Roger Fleetwood-Hesketh
Political offices
Preceded by George Tryon	Minister of Pensions; 1935–1936	Succeeded by Herwald Ramsbotham
Preceded by Euan Wallace	Secretary for Overseas Trade; 1937–1940	Succeeded by Geoffrey Shakespeare
Preceded by Sir John Gilmour	Minister of Shipping; 1940	Succeeded by Ronald Cross
Preceded by Sir Reginald Dorman-Smith	Minister of Agriculture and Fisheries; 1940–1945	Succeeded by Tom Williams
Peerage of the United Kingdom
New creation	Viscount Hudson; 1952–1957	Succeeded by Robert William Hudson
