= Ian Percival =

British politician (1921–1998)

Portrait by Walter Bird, 1960

Sir Walter Ian Percival QC (11 May 1921 – 4 April 1998) was a British Conservative Party politician.

== Background ==
Percival was educated at Latymer Upper School and St Catharine's College, Cambridge, where he read law. He was commissioned from Sandhurst into The Buffs in 1941 and served in the Second World War in North Africa and Burma, attaining the rank of Major. He became a barrister, was called to the Bar from the Inner Temple in 1948, and also worked as a part-time economics professor. He served as a councillor on Kensington Borough Council (1952–59). He was made a Queen's Counsel in 1963, and was knighted in 1979.

== Political career ==
He first stood unsuccessfully in the Battersea North constituency at the 1951 general election and again at the 1955 election. He was elected as member of parliament for Southport at the 1959 general election, holding the seat until he retired at the 1987 election. Although coveting a Ministerial post, he was overlooked for the position he wanted in 1979 when Margaret Thatcher came to power, Secretary of State for Northern Ireland. Instead, he served as Solicitor General from 1979 to 1983.

On some issues, Percival's political views were to the right of the mainstream within the Conservative Party; he campaigned unsuccessfully to restore the death penalty (introducing an unsuccessful Bill to restore it for terrorists in 1984 following the Brighton hotel bombing), and held strong views on the rigorous application of the law. He also called for the criminalisation of clubs and newsletters that existed for the purpose of allowing gay people to meet one another, opposed attempts to decriminalize homosexuality, and supported retaining imprisonment for life as the penalty for consensual anal sex (although he claimed this was not because he wanted to see offenders sent to prison for life, but to ensure that "courts have a complete discretion in the case of a conviction").

Percival was a freemason.

== Retirement ==
After retiring, he supported several causes, including the establishment of a hospital in India after the Bhopal disaster. In 1993 he became the head of a Trust to complete the hospital, following lengthy legal negotiations with Union Carbide while he was engaged as an attorney in the US law firm Sidley and Austin. He died before its completion.

Parliament of the United Kingdom
Preceded by Roger Fleetwood-Hesketh	Member of Parliament for Southport; 1959–1987	Succeeded by Ronnie Fearn
Legal offices
Preceded by Sir Peter Archer	Solicitor General for England and Wales; 1979–1983	Succeeded by Sir Patrick Mayhew
