= Hubert Bentliff =

British lawyer, civil servant, and politician

Hubert David Bentliff (28 May 1891 – 21 April 1953) was a British lawyer, civil servant, and politician.

Bentliff was the son of Walter Bentliff (1859–1940), a leading figure in the National Union of Teachers. He was educated at Dulwich College and Trinity College Cambridge, receiving a BSc from London University in 1910 and an MA from Cambridge in 1917.

He served in the First World War from 1914–1918 in the Essex Regiment, rising to the rank of captain. After the war, he studied to be a barrister, and was called to the Bar in 1920 in the Inner Temple. Later he became a public servant, working for the National Assistance Board, serving as Under-Secretary from 1946-50.

In 1939, at the beginning of the Second World War, some staff of the Board (then known as the Unemployment Assistance Board) were evacuated from London to Southport, and Bentliff moved there. In the general election of 1950 he was selected to contest the Southport constituency as candidate of the Liberal Party. He came third. When the sitting MP died a year later, he was again Liberal candidate in the ensuing by-election. Again came third, with substantially fewer votes. He was a candidate in the Southport municipal elections when died a year later at the age of 61.

He married Barbara Brown in 1919. She died in 1922. They had no children and he never remarried. He listed his occupations in Who's Who as 'listening to music and sitting in the sunshine'.
