= 1952 Southport by-election =

UK parliamentary by-election

The 1952 Southport by-election was held on 6 February 1952 after the incumbent Conservative MP Robert Hudson was elevated to a hereditary peerage. The Conservative candidate was Roger Fleetwood-Hesketh, a former mayor of Southport. The Labour Party selected 32-year old Alan Tillotson, an executive of the Bolton Evening News. Hubert Bentliff, who had been the Liberal Party's candidate at the previous year's general election, ran again for the party.

The campaign focused mainly on issues arising from the general election, which had brought the Conservatives to power after six years of Labour government. For the Conservatives the focus was on the cost of living: "we are applying the brakes to arrest the disastrous fall in the buying power of the pound ... we are determined to put a stop to the creeping inflation which is not only eating into our social services, pensions and savings, but destroying our capacity to import the food and raw materials by which we live". Labour insisted that the Conservatives had won the general election by blaming the party for all the difficulties of the post war period: "They now admit ... that they were caused by circumstances outside the control of any Government" and warned that cuts in social services "might foreshadow more serious attacks on the welfare State in the Budget".

With turnout down around 10,000 votes from the general election, the Labour vote declined slightly, Liberal support fell by nearly 4,000 and Conservative votes by nearly 6,000.. The result was a comfortable majority for the Conservatives in a constituency that they had only twice failed to win since the beginning of the century.

== Result ==
Southport by-election, 1952
Party	Candidate	Votes	%	±%
Conservative	Roger Fleetwood-Hesketh	24,589	62.0	+1.8
Labour	A L Tillotson	11,310	28.5	+3.7
Liberal	Hubert Bentliff	3,776	9.5	−5.5
Majority		13,279	33.5	−1.9
Turnout		39,675		
Conservative hold		Swing		

== Previous result ==
General election 1951: Southport
Party	Candidate	Votes	%	±%
Conservative	Robert Hudson	30,388	60.2	+3.9
Labour	H O Ellis	12,535	24.8	−2.0
Liberal	Hubert Bentliff	7,576	15.0	−1.9
Majority		17,853	35.4	+5.9
Turnout		50,499	77.7	−4.1
Conservative hold		Swing	+2.9	
