= Viscount Hudson =

Title in the Peerage of the United Kingdom

Viscount Hudson, of Pewsey in the County of Wiltshire, was a title in the Peerage of the United Kingdom. It was created on 5 January 1952 for the Conservative politician Robert Hudson. He was the son of Robert William Hudson and the grandson of soap-flake manufacturer Robert Spear Hudson. The title became extinct on the early death of the first Viscount's son, the second Viscount, in 1963.

== Viscounts Hudson (1952) ==
- Robert Spear Hudson, 1st Viscount Hudson (1886–1957)
- Robert William Hudson, 2nd Viscount Hudson (1924–1963)
