= George Augustus Pilkington =

British politician

Pilkington

Sir George Augustus Pilkington (7 October 1848 – 28 January 1916) was an English medical doctor and Liberal politician.

Pilkington was born at Upwell, Cambridgeshire, as George Augustus Coombe, the son of R. G. Coombe a surgeon. He was educated privately and trained for medicine at Guy's Hospital, London. He became MRCS Eng and LSA in 1870. He practiced medicine in Southport from 1870 to 1884 when he was House Surgeon to Southport Infirmary, Medical Officer of the North Meols District, Ormskirk Union, Surgeon to the Royal Naval Artillery Volunteers, and Medical Officer to the Southport Convalescent Hospital and the Southport Infirmary. He married Mary Elizabeth Pilkington, daughter of James Pilkington, former MP for Blackburn in 1876 and changed his name to Pilkington on the death of his brother-in-law.

Pilkington was Mayor of Southport from 1884 to 1885 In 1885, he was elected Member of Parliament for Southport but lost the seat in 1886. He was a councillor and alderman on Lancashire County Council, Deputy Lieutenant, J.P., and Honorary Colonel of the 3rd Liverpool Volunteer Regiment until October 1902.

He was one of the initial subscribers to the "Universal Glacarium and Ice Manufacturing Company Limited", registered 28 March 1884 to acquire the assets of the Southport Glacarium and Ice Manufacturing Co. Ltd. and "to establish glacaria, or ice skating halls and ice-manufacturing works in other parts of the U.K."

Pilkington was knighted in 1893. He won the seat at Southport again in a by-election in 1899, but lost it again at the 1900 general election. He was High Sheriff of Lancashire in 1911.

Parliament of the United Kingdom
Preceded by See; South West Lancashire constituency	Member of Parliament for Southport; New constituency 1885 – 1886	Succeeded by George Nathaniel Curzon
Preceded by Sir Herbert Naylor-Leyland	Member of Parliament for Southport; 1899 – 1900	Succeeded by Edward Marshall-Hall
Honorary titles
Preceded by Reginald Arthur Tatton	High Sheriff of Lancashire; 1911	Succeeded by John Stone
