= Southport (constituency) =

Parliamentary constituency in the United Kingdom, 1885 onwards

Coordinates: 53.647°N 3.007°W

- County constituency for the House of Commons
- Interactive map of boundaries since 2024
- Location within North West England
- County: Merseyside
- Electorate: 74,168 (March 2020)
- Major settlements: Southport, Ainsdale-on-Sea

Current constituency
- Created: 1885
- Member of Parliament: Patrick Hurley (Labour)
- Seats: One
- Created from: South West Lancashire

Southport is a constituency in Merseyside which has been represented in the House of Commons of the UK Parliament since 2024 by Patrick Hurley of the Labour Party.

== Constituency profile ==
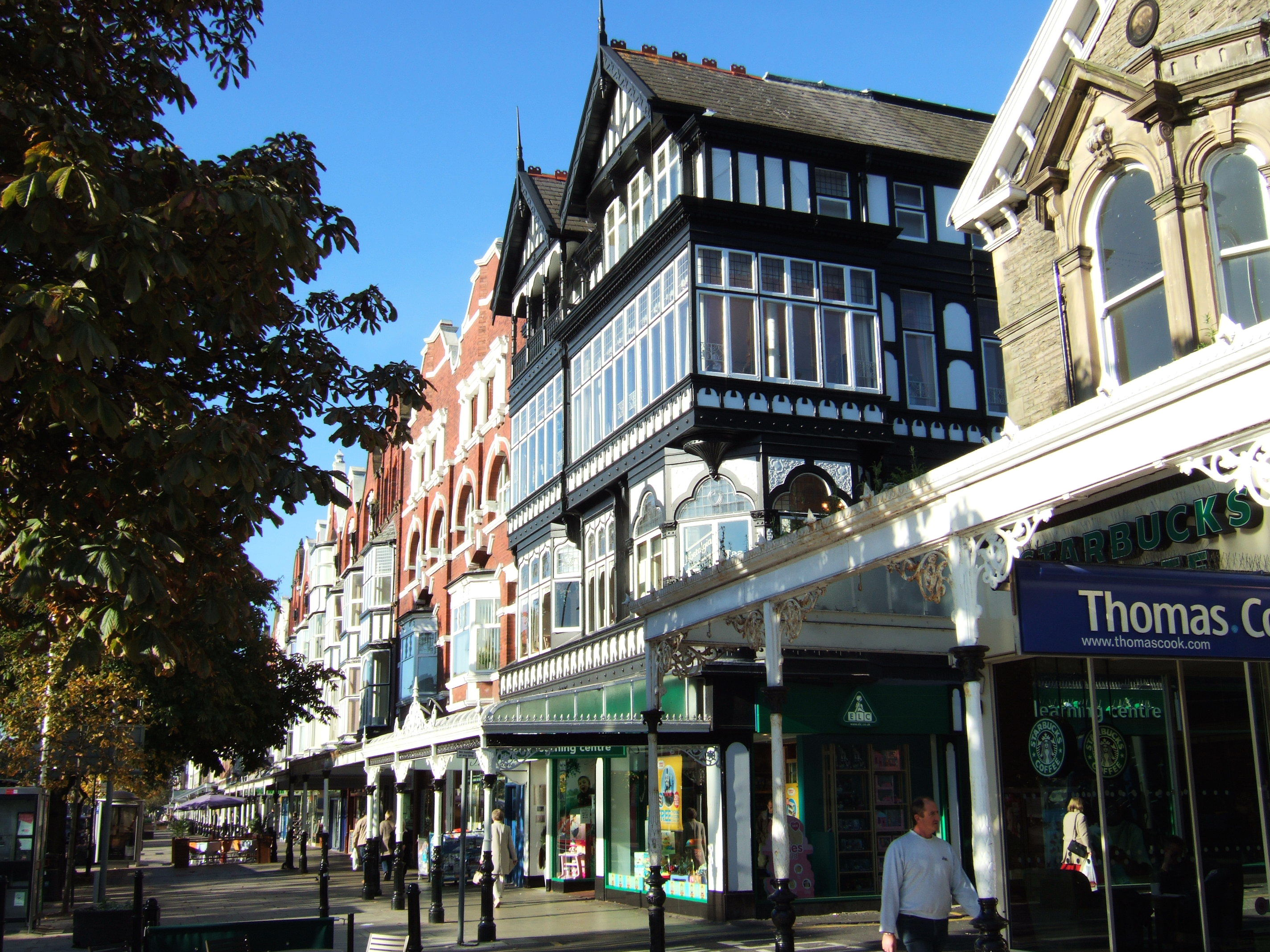
Lord Street, Southport

Southport is a constituency in North West England, partly within Merseyside and partly within Lancashire. It covers the town of Southport and the rural villages to its east, including Banks, Rufford, Tarleton and Hesketh Bank.

Southport is a large coastal town located between Liverpool and Preston. This was an area of mostly-uninhabited sand dunes prior to the 19th century when the town was founded as a seaside resort. The area is often referred to as England's "Golf Coast" due to its high concentration of golf courses. The constituency has average levels of wealth overall; the town centre is highly-deprived with most residents living in dense flats or shared houses whilst the outer suburbs and rural villages are wealthier. House prices here are generally similar to the rest of North West England but lower than the UK average.

Southport has low proportions of young and middle-aged adults and a large retired population. Residents have below-average rates of income but above-average levels of homeownership. The child poverty rate is in line with the overall UK figure. Residents have average levels of education and a high proportion work in the health, retail and tourism sectors. The percentage claiming unemployment benefits is low. White people made up 95% of the population at the 2021 census.

Most of the constituency is represented by Liberal Democrats at the local council level with some Reform UK councillors elected in Blowick and Conservatives elected in the rural villages. An estimated 54% of voters in Southport supported leaving the European Union in the 2016 referendum, marginally higher than the UK-wide figure of 52%.

== Boundaries ==
Map of boundaries 1983–2024

=== Historic ===
Southport in Lancashire, boundaries used 1974–1983

1885–1918: The Borough of Southport, the Sessional Division of Southport, and the parishes of Blundell, Great and Little Crosby, Ince, and Thornton.

1918–1983: The County Borough of Southport.

1983–2024: The Metropolitan Borough of Sefton wards of Ainsdale, Birkdale, Cambridge, Dukes, Kew, Meols, and Norwood.

=== Current ===
Further to the 2023 review of Westminster constituencies which came into effect for the 2024 general election, the constituency was defined as being composed of the following as they existed on 1 December 2020:

- The Metropolitan Borough of Sefton wards of: Birkdale; Cambridge; Duke’s; Kew; Meols; Norwood.
- The Borough of West Lancashire wards of: Hesketh-with-Becconsall; North Meols; Rufford; Tarleton.

The four, largely rural, West Lancashire Borough wards were transferred from South Ribble, offset by the loss of Ainsdale ward to Sefton Central.

Following local government boundary reviews in West Lancashire and Sefton which came into effect in May 2023 and May 2026 respectively, the constituency currently comprises the following:

- The Metropolitan Borough of Sefton wards of: Birkdale; Cambridge; Duke’s; Kew; Meols; Norwood.
- The Borough of West Lancashire wards of: Burscough Bridge & Rufford (part); North Meols & Hesketh Bank; Tarleton Village.

The constituency covers the whole town of Southport and the localities of Birkdale, Blowick, Churchtown, Crossens, Highpark, Hillside, Kew, Marshside, Meols Cop, and Woodvale. It also now includes the West Lancashire villages of Banks, Hesketh Bank, Becconsall, Tarleton and Rufford. It is bordered to the north by Fylde (across the Ribble estuary), to the east by South Ribble, and to the south by Sefton Central and West Lancashire.

== History ==
=== Prominent members ===
In the 19th century, the constituency was represented by George Nathaniel Curzon, who later became the Viceroy of India. Trial barrister Edward Marshall Hall represented the seat from 1900 to 1906, while Sir John Brunner, 2nd Baronet held the seat from 1923 until 1924.

Robert Hudson held the seat from 1931 to 1952. During World War II he was the Minister of Agriculture and Fisheries. He was made a viscount in 1952.

=== Political history ===
Until 2024, the constituency had been a Liberal or Conservative seat throughout its history, and marginal for much of that time. It changed hands 11 times between the parties after it was created in 1885, with nine Conservative MPs and eight Liberal or Liberal Democrat MPs in its history.

During the nadir of the Liberal Party, from the 1930s to the 1960s, the constituency became a safe Conservative seat, with absolute majorities from 1931 until 1970 inclusive.

Former Deputy Prime Minister John Prescott was the Labour Party candidate for the seat in 1966 and came in second place.

With the revival the Liberal Party's fortunes in the early 1970s, elections became close contests once again. The constituency changed hands in the 1987 general election, when it was won by Ronnie Fearn of the Liberal Party, for the SDP–Liberal Alliance, shortly before the two parties merged to form the Liberal Democrats. Fearn had contested the seat unsuccessfully for the Liberals throughout the 1970s.

Fearn lost the seat to the Conservatives' Matthew Banks at the 1992 election, one of the few Conservative gains at that election, only to regain it at the 1997 election. The Liberal Democrats held the seat, under John Pugh (after Fearn stood down) in 2001 until 2017.

The seat was one of the eight Liberal Democrat seats that survived its national vote share collapse at the 2015 general election, although there was a higher-than-average drop in the Liberal Democrats' vote share. Pugh opted not to re-contest the seat in the 2017 general election, at which it returned to the Conservatives, the only seat the Tories gained from the Liberal Democrats in 2017 (aside from Richmond Park, which they had gained at a 2016 by-election).

In the 2016 referendum on the UK's membership of the European Union, the Metropolitan Borough of Sefton, of which the constituency is a part, voted to remain in the European Union by 51.9%. Given its demography, it is estimated that Southport voted to remain by 54%.

In 2019, a resurgent Labour vote pushed the Liberal Democrats into third place for the first time since 1966 with the seat becoming a Tory-Labour marginal. Labour won the seat from the Conservatives in 2024, making it the first time Labour has held the seat, as well as the first time Labour has held every seat in Merseyside.

== Members of Parliament ==
| Election | Member | Party |
|---|---|---|
| 1885 | George Augustus Pilkington | Liberal |
| 1886 | George Curzon | Conservative |
| 1898 by-election | Sir Herbert Naylor-Leyland | Liberal |
| 1899 by-election | George Augustus Pilkington | Liberal |
| 1900 | Edward Marshall Hall | Conservative |
| 1906 | John Meir Astbury | Liberal |
| 1910 | Godfrey Dalrymple-White | Conservative |
| 1923 | John Brunner | Liberal |
| 1924 | Godfrey Dalrymple-White | Conservative |
| 1931 | Robert Hudson | Conservative |
| 1952 by-election | Roger Fleetwood-Hesketh | Conservative |
| 1959 | Ian Percival | Conservative |
| 1987 | Ronnie Fearn | Liberal |
| 1988 | Ronnie Fearn | Liberal Democrats |
| 1992 | Matthew Banks | Conservative |
| 1997 | Ronnie Fearn | Liberal Democrats |
| 2001 | John Pugh | Liberal Democrats |
| 2017 | Damien Moore | Conservative |
| 2024 | Patrick Hurley | Labour |

== Elections ==
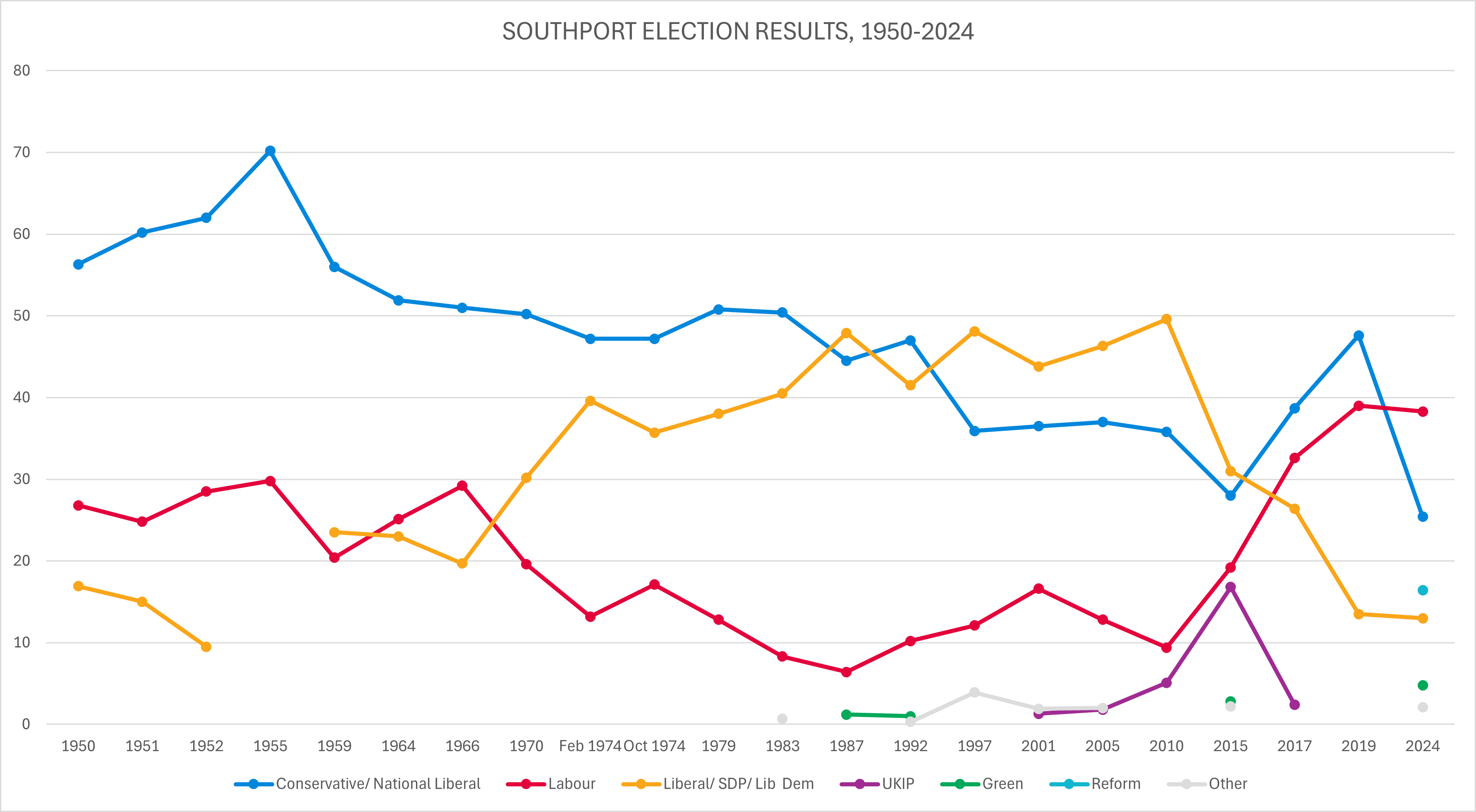
Election results 1950–2024

=== Elections in the 2020s ===
General election 2024: Southport
| Party | Candidate | Votes | % | ±% |
|---|---|---|---|---|
| Labour | Patrick Hurley | 17,252 | 38.3 | +1.5 |
| Conservative | Damien Moore | 11,463 | 25.4 | −25.0 |
| Reform | Andrew Lynn | 7,395 | 16.4 | New |
| Liberal Democrats | Erin Harvey | 5,868 | 13.0 | +0.5 |
| Green | Edwin Black | 2,159 | 4.8 | +4.4 |
| Independent | Sean Halsall | 922 | 2.1 | New |
| Majority | | 5,789 | 12.9 | N/A |
| Turnout | | 45,059 | 61.2 | −6.8 |
| Registered electors | | 73,641 | | |
| Labour gain from Conservative | | Swing | +13.3 | |

=== Elections in the 2010s ===
General election 2019: Southport
| Party | Candidate | Votes | % | ±% |
|---|---|---|---|---|
| Conservative | Damien Moore | 22,914 | 47.6 | +8.9 |
| Labour | Liz Savage | 18,767 | 39.0 | +6.4 |
| Liberal Democrats | John Wright | 6,499 | 13.5 | −12.9 |
| Majority | | 4,147 | 8.6 | +2.5 |
| Turnout | | 48,180 | 68.0 | −1.1 |
| Conservative hold | | Swing | +1.3 | |

General election 2017: Southport
| Party | Candidate | Votes | % | ±% |
|---|---|---|---|---|
| Conservative | Damien Moore | 18,541 | 38.7 | +10.7 |
| Labour | Liz Savage | 15,627 | 32.6 | +13.4 |
| Liberal Democrats | Sue McGuire | 12,661 | 26.4 | −4.6 |
| UKIP | Terry Durrance | 1,127 | 2.4 | −14.4 |
| Majority | | 2,914 | 6.1 | N/A |
| Turnout | | 47,956 | 69.1 | +3.6 |
| Conservative gain from Liberal Democrats | | Swing | −1.4 | |

General election 2015: Southport
| Party | Candidate | Votes | % | ±% |
|---|---|---|---|---|
| Liberal Democrats | John Pugh | 13,652 | 31.0 | −18.6 |
| Conservative | Damien Moore | 12,330 | 28.0 | −7.8 |
| Labour | Liz Savage | 8,468 | 19.2 | +9.8 |
| UKIP | Terry Durrance | 7,429 | 16.8 | +11.7 |
| Green | Laurence Rankin | 1,230 | 2.8 | New |
| Southport Party | Jacqueline Barlow | 992 | 2.2 | New |
| Majority | | 1,322 | 3.0 | −10.8 |
| Turnout | | 44,101 | 65.5 | +0.4 |
| Liberal Democrats hold | | Swing | −5.4 | |

General election 2010: Southport
| Party | Candidate | Votes | % | ±% |
|---|---|---|---|---|
| Liberal Democrats | John Pugh | 21,707 | 49.6 | +3.3 |
| Conservative | Brenda Porter | 15,683 | 35.8 | −1.2 |
| Labour | Jim Conalty | 4,116 | 9.4 | −3.4 |
| UKIP | Terry Durrance | 2,251 | 5.1 | +3.3 |
| Majority | | 6,024 | 13.8 | +4.5 |
| Turnout | | 43,757 | 65.1 | +4.1 |
| Liberal Democrats hold | | Swing | +2.2 | |

=== Elections in the 2000s ===
General election 2005: Southport
| Party | Candidate | Votes | % | ±% |
|---|---|---|---|---|
| Liberal Democrats | John Pugh | 19,093 | 46.3 | +2.5 |
| Conservative | Mark S. Bigley | 15,255 | 37.0 | +0.5 |
| Labour | Paul Brant | 5,277 | 12.8 | −3.8 |
| UKIP | Terry Durrance | 749 | 1.8 | +0.5 |
| Your Party | Bill Givens | 589 | 1.4 | New |
| Veritas | Harry Forster | 238 | 0.6 | New |
| Majority | | 3,838 | 9.3 | +2.0 |
| Turnout | | 41,201 | 61.0 | +1.4 |
| Liberal Democrats hold | | Swing | +1.0 | |

General election 2001: Southport
| Party | Candidate | Votes | % | ±% |
|---|---|---|---|---|
| Liberal Democrats | John Pugh | 18,011 | 43.8 | −4.3 |
| Conservative | Laurence Jones | 15,004 | 36.5 | +0.6 |
| Labour | Paul Brant | 6,816 | 16.6 | +4.5 |
| Liberal | David Green | 767 | 1.9 | +1.1 |
| UKIP | Gerry Kelley | 555 | 1.3 | New |
| Majority | | 3,007 | 7.3 | −4.9 |
| Turnout | | 41,153 | 58.6 | −13.5 |
| Liberal Democrats hold | | Swing | | |

=== Elections in the 1990s ===
General election 1997: Southport
| Party | Candidate | Votes | % | ±% |
|---|---|---|---|---|
| Liberal Democrats | Ronnie Fearn | 24,356 | 48.1 | +6.6 |
| Conservative | Matthew Banks | 18,186 | 35.9 | −11.1 |
| Labour | Sarah Norman | 6,129 | 12.1 | +1.9 |
| Referendum | Frank Buckle | 1,368 | 2.7 | New |
| Liberal | Susan Ashton | 386 | 0.8 | New |
| Natural Law | Elizabeth Lines | 93 | 0.2 | −0.1 |
| National Democrats | Michael Middleton | 92 | 0.2 | New |
| Majority | | 6,170 | 12.2 | N/A |
| Turnout | | 50,610 | 72.1 | −5.5 |
| Liberal Democrats gain from Conservative | | Swing | +8.9 | |

General election 1992: Southport
| Party | Candidate | Votes | % | ±% |
|---|---|---|---|---|
| Conservative | Matthew Banks | 26,081 | 47.0 | +2.5 |
| Liberal Democrats | Ronnie Fearn | 23,018 | 41.5 | −6.4 |
| Labour | James King | 5,637 | 10.2 | +3.8 |
| Green | Justin Walker | 545 | 1.0 | −0.2 |
| Natural Law | Geoffrey Clements | 159 | 0.3 | New |
| Majority | | 3,063 | 5.5 | N/A |
| Turnout | | 55,440 | 77.6 | +1.3 |
| Conservative gain from Liberal Democrats | | Swing | +4.5 | |

=== Elections in the 1980s ===
General election 1987: Southport
| Party | Candidate | Votes | % | ±% |
|---|---|---|---|---|
| Liberal | Ronnie Fearn | 26,110 | 47.9 | +7.4 |
| Conservative | Nigel Thomas | 24,261 | 44.5 | −5.9 |
| Labour | Audrey Moore | 3,483 | 6.4 | −1.9 |
| Green | Justin Walker | 653 | 1.2 | New |
| Majority | | 1,849 | 3.4 | N/A |
| Turnout | | 54,507 | 76.3 | +3.8 |
| Liberal gain from Conservative | | Swing | +6.7 | |

General election 1983: Southport
| Party | Candidate | Votes | % | ±% |
|---|---|---|---|---|
| Conservative | Ian Percival | 25,612 | 50.4 | −0.4 |
| Liberal | Iain Brodie Browne | 20,573 | 40.5 | +2.5 |
| Labour | Francis Brady | 4,233 | 8.3 | −2.9 |
| Independent | Kevin Wood | 374 | 0.7 | New |
| Majority | | 5,039 | 9.9 | −2.9 |
| Turnout | | 50,792 | 72.5 | −2.2 |
| Conservative hold | | Swing | | |

=== Elections in the 1970s ===
General election 1979: Southport
| Party | Candidate | Votes | % | ±% |
|---|---|---|---|---|
| Conservative | Ian Percival | 25,953 | 50.8 | +3.6 |
| Liberal | Ronnie Fearn | 19,426 | 38.0 | +2.3 |
| Labour | I.Gari James | 5,725 | 12.8 | −4.3 |
| Majority | | 6,527 | 12.8 | +1.3 |
| Turnout | | 51,104 | 74.7 | +1.0 |
| Conservative hold | | Swing | | |

General election October 1974: Southport
| Party | Candidate | Votes | % | ±% |
|---|---|---|---|---|
| Conservative | Ian Percival | 23,014 | 47.2 | ±0.0 |
| Liberal | Ronnie Fearn | 17,387 | 35.7 | −3.9 |
| Labour | I.Gari James | 8,323 | 17.1 | +3.9 |
| Majority | | 5,627 | 11.5 | +3.9 |
| Turnout | | 48,724 | 73.7 | −3.7 |
| Conservative hold | | Swing | | |

General election February 1974: Southport
| Party | Candidate | Votes | % | ±% |
|---|---|---|---|---|
| Conservative | Ian Percival | 23,975 | 47.2 | −3.0 |
| Liberal | Ronnie Fearn | 20,093 | 39.6 | +9.4 |
| Labour | Peter R. Ward | 6,690 | 13.2 | −6.4 |
| Majority | | 3,882 | 7.6 | −12.4 |
| Turnout | | 50,758 | 77.4 | +6.9 |
| Conservative hold | | Swing | −6.2 | |

General election 1970: Southport
| Party | Candidate | Votes | % | ±% |
|---|---|---|---|---|
| Conservative | Ian Percival | 22,950 | 50.2 | −0.8 |
| Liberal | Ronnie Fearn | 13,809 | 30.2 | +10.5 |
| Labour | Bruce George | 8,950 | 19.6 | −9.6 |
| Majority | | 9,141 | 20.0 | −1.2 |
| Turnout | | 45,709 | 70.5 | −2.2 |
| Conservative hold | | Swing | N/A | |

=== Elections in the 1960s ===
General election 1966: Southport
| Party | Candidate | Votes | % | ±% |
|---|---|---|---|---|
| Conservative | Ian Percival | 22,324 | 51.0 | −0.9 |
| Labour | John Prescott | 12,798 | 29.2 | +4.1 |
| Liberal | C. Jack Coleman | 8,630 | 19.7 | −3.3 |
| Majority | | 9,526 | 21.8 | −5.0 |
| Turnout | | 43,752 | 72.7 | −3.8 |
| Conservative hold | | Swing | −2.5 | |

General election 1964: Southport
| Party | Candidate | Votes | % | ±% |
|---|---|---|---|---|
| Conservative | Ian Percival | 23,917 | 51.9 | −4.1 |
| Labour | Leonard Goldwater | 11,572 | 25.1 | +4.7 |
| Liberal | C. Jack Coleman | 10,609 | 23.0 | −0.5 |
| Majority | | 12,345 | 26.8 | −5.7 |
| Turnout | | 46,098 | 76.5 | −0.3 |
| Conservative hold | | Swing | −4.4 | |

=== Elections in the 1950s ===
General election 1959: Southport
| Party | Candidate | Votes | % | ±% |
|---|---|---|---|---|
| Conservative | Ian Percival | 26,905 | 56.0 | −14.2 |
| Liberal | Sam Goldberg | 11,292 | 23.5 | +23.5 |
| Labour | Charles W Hadfield | 9,805 | 20.4 | −9.4 |
| Majority | | 15,613 | 32.5 | −8.0 |
| Turnout | | 48,002 | 76.8 | +8.0 |
| Conservative hold | | Swing | | |

General election 1955: Southport
| Party | Candidate | Votes | % | ±% |
|---|---|---|---|---|
| Conservative | Roger Fleetwood-Hesketh | 30,268 | 70.2 | +10.0 |
| Labour | Peter Cameron | 12,827 | 29.8 | +5.0 |
| Majority | | 17,441 | 40.4 | +4.9 |
| Turnout | | 43,095 | 68.8 | −8.9 |
| Conservative hold | | Swing | +2.5 | |

1952 Southport by-election
| Party | Candidate | Votes | % | ±% |
|---|---|---|---|---|
| Conservative | Roger Fleetwood-Hesketh | 24,589 | 62.0 | +1.8 |
| Labour | Alan Lever Tillotson | 11,310 | 28.5 | +3.7 |
| Liberal | Hubert Bentliff | 3,776 | 9.5 | −5.5 |
| Majority | | 13,279 | 33.5 | −1.9 |
| Turnout | | 39,675 | | |
| Conservative hold | | Swing | | |

General election 1951: Southport
| Party | Candidate | Votes | % | ±% |
|---|---|---|---|---|
| Conservative | Robert Hudson | 30,388 | 60.2 | +3.9 |
| Labour | H Owen Ellis | 12,535 | 24.8 | −2.0 |
| Liberal | Hubert Bentliff | 7,576 | 15.0 | −1.9 |
| Majority | | 17,853 | 35.4 | +5.9 |
| Turnout | | 50,499 | 77.7 | −4.1 |
| Conservative hold | | Swing | +2.9 | |

General election 1950: Southport
| Party | Candidate | Votes | % | ±% |
|---|---|---|---|---|
| Conservative | Robert Hudson | 29,766 | 56.3 | +3.6 |
| Labour | J P Bonney | 14,159 | 26.8 | ±0.0 |
| Liberal | Harry Ellington | 8,933 | 16.9 | −3.6 |
| Majority | | 15,607 | 29.5 | +3.6 |
| Turnout | | 52,858 | 81.8 | +7.6 |
| Conservative hold | | Swing | +1.8 | |

=== Elections in the 1940s ===
General election 1945: Southport
| Party | Candidate | Votes | % | ±% |
|---|---|---|---|---|
| Conservative | Robert Hudson | 26,792 | 52.7 | −19.5 |
| Labour | William Hamling | 13,596 | 26.8 | −1.0 |
| Liberal | Robert Martin | 10,404 | 20.5 | New |
| Majority | | 13,196 | 25.9 | −18.5 |
| Turnout | | 50,792 | 74.2 | +3.3 |
| Conservative hold | | Swing | | |

=== Elections in the 1930s ===
General election 1935: Southport
| Party | Candidate | Votes | % | ±% |
|---|---|---|---|---|
| Conservative | Robert Hudson | 29,652 | 72.2 | +3.8 |
| Labour | Robert Carrington-Willis | 11,419 | 27.8 | New |
| Majority | | 18,233 | 44.4 | +7.6 |
| Turnout | | 41,071 | 70.9 | −8.8 |
| Conservative hold | | Swing | | |

General election 1931: Southport
| Party | Candidate | Votes | % | ±% |
|---|---|---|---|---|
| Conservative | Robert Hudson | 30,307 | 68.4 | +20.1 |
| Liberal | Moelwyn Hughes | 13,983 | 31.6 | −7.8 |
| Majority | | 16,324 | 36.8 | +27.9 |
| Turnout | | 44,290 | 79.7 | +0.1 |
| Conservative hold | | Swing | | |

=== Elections in the 1920s ===
General election 1929: Southport
| Party | Candidate | Votes | % | ±% |
|---|---|---|---|---|
| Unionist | Godfrey Dalrymple-White | 21,161 | 48.3 | −12.7 |
| Liberal | Cecil Ramage | 17,220 | 39.4 | +0.4 |
| Labour | Arthur Leonard Williams | 5,380 | 12.3 | New |
| Majority | | 3,941 | 8.9 | −13.1 |
| Turnout | | 43,761 | 79.6 | +0.9 |
| Unionist hold | | Swing | −6.6 | |

General election 1924: Southport
| Party | Candidate | Votes | % | ±% |
|---|---|---|---|---|
| Unionist | Godfrey Dalrymple-White | 17,430 | 61.0 | +12.8 |
| Liberal | John Brunner | 11,158 | 39.0 | −12.8 |
| Majority | | 6,272 | 22.0 | N/A |
| Turnout | | 28,588 | 78.7 | +2.8 |
| Unionist gain from Liberal | | Swing | | |

Brunner

General election 1923: Southport
| Party | Candidate | Votes | % | ±% |
|---|---|---|---|---|
| Liberal | John Brunner | 13,704 | 51.8 | +5.0 |
| Unionist | Thomas Comyn-Platt | 12,776 | 48.2 | −5.0 |
| Majority | | 928 | 3.6 | N/A |
| Turnout | | 26,480 | 75.9 | −0.4 |
| Liberal gain from Unionist | | Swing | +5.0 | |

General election 1922: Southport
| Party | Candidate | Votes | % | ±% |
|---|---|---|---|---|
| Unionist | Godfrey Dalrymple-White | 13,733 | 53.2 | −18.8 |
| Liberal | John Brunner | 12,068 | 46.8 | New |
| Majority | | 1,665 | 6.4 | −37.6 |
| Turnout | | 25,801 | 76.3 | +14.7 |
| Unionist hold | | Swing | | |

=== Elections in the 1910s ===
General election 1918: Southport
| Party | | Candidate | Votes | % | ±% |
|---|---|---|---|---|---|
| C | Unionist | Godfrey Dalrymple-White | 14,707 | 72.0 | +19.7 |
| | Labour | Arthur Greenwood | 5,727 | 28.0 | New |
| Majority | | | 8,980 | 44.0 | +39.4 |
| Turnout | | | 20,434 | 61.6 | −24.0 |
| | Unionist hold | | Swing | | |
C indicates candidate endorsed by the coalition government.

Woodcock

General election December 1910: Southport
| Party | Candidate | Votes | % | ±% |
|---|---|---|---|---|
| Conservative | Godfrey Dalrymple-White | 7,467 | 52.3 | +0.9 |
| Liberal | H. B. D. Woodcock | 6,798 | 47.7 | −0.9 |
| Majority | | 669 | 4.6 | +1.8 |
| Turnout | | 14,265 | 85.6 | −3.6 |
| Conservative hold | | Swing | | |

General election January 1910: Southport
| Party | Candidate | Votes | % | ±% |
|---|---|---|---|---|
| Conservative | Godfrey Dalrymple-White | 7,637 | 51.4 | +2.3 |
| Liberal | Maurice de Forest | 7,218 | 48.6 | −2.3 |
| Majority | | 419 | 2.8 | N/A |
| Turnout | | 14,855 | 89.2 | +1.9 |
| Conservative gain from Liberal | | Swing | | |

=== Elections in the 1900s ===
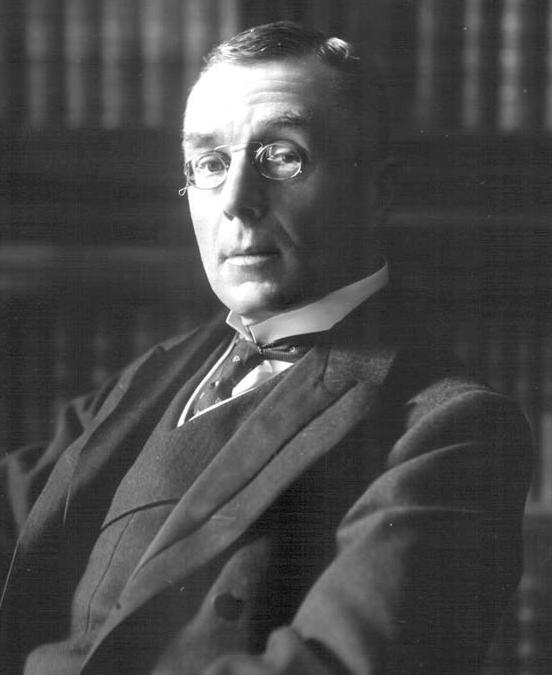
Astbury

General election 1906: Southport
| Party | Candidate | Votes | % | ±% |
|---|---|---|---|---|
| Liberal | John Astbury | 6,607 | 50.9 | +1.9 |
| Conservative | Edward Marshall Hall | 6,367 | 49.1 | −1.9 |
| Majority | | 240 | 1.8 | N/A |
| Turnout | | 12,974 | 87.3 | +5.0 |
| Registered electors | | 14,854 | | |
| Liberal gain from Conservative | | Swing | +1.9 | |

General election 1900: Southport
| Party | Candidate | Votes | % | ±% |
|---|---|---|---|---|
| Conservative | Edward Marshall Hall | 5,522 | 51.0 | −3.0 |
| Liberal | George Augustus Pilkington | 5,313 | 49.0 | +3.0 |
| Majority | | 209 | 2.0 | −6.0 |
| Turnout | | 10,835 | 82.3 | −0.7 |
| Registered electors | | 13,164 | | |
| Conservative hold | | Swing | −3.0 | |

=== Elections in the 1890s ===
Pilkington

1899 Southport by-election
| Party | Candidate | Votes | % | ±% |
|---|---|---|---|---|
| Liberal | George Augustus Pilkington | 5,635 | 52.7 | +6.7 |
| Conservative | Charles Balfour | 5,052 | 47.3 | −6.7 |
| Majority | | 583 | 5.4 | N/A |
| Turnout | | 10,687 | 84.4 | +1.4 |
| Registered electors | | 12,656 | | |
| Liberal gain from Conservative | | Swing | +6.7 | |

- Caused by Naylor-Leyland's death.

1898 Southport by-election
| Party | Candidate | Votes | % | ±% |
|---|---|---|---|---|
| Liberal | Herbert Naylor-Leyland | 5,100 | 51.4 | +5.4 |
| Conservative | Edward Bootle-Wilbraham | 4,828 | 48.6 | −5.4 |
| Majority | | 272 | 2.8 | N/A |
| Turnout | | 9,928 | 80.1 | −2.9 |
| Registered electors | | 12,395 | | |
| Liberal gain from Conservative | | Swing | +5.4 | |

- Caused by Curzon's appointment as Viceroy and Governor-General of India.

General election 1895: Southport
| Party | Candidate | Votes | % | ±% |
|---|---|---|---|---|
| Conservative | George Curzon | 5,162 | 54.0 | +0.6 |
| Liberal | Herbert Naylor-Leyland | 4,399 | 46.0 | −0.6 |
| Majority | | 763 | 8.0 | +1.2 |
| Turnout | | 9,561 | 83.0 | −1.6 |
| Registered electors | | 11,523 | | |
| Conservative hold | | Swing | +0.6 | |

General election 1892: Southport
| Party | Candidate | Votes | % | ±% |
|---|---|---|---|---|
| Conservative | George Curzon | 4,752 | 53.4 | +0.1 |
| Liberal | George Pollard | 4,148 | 46.6 | −0.1 |
| Majority | | 604 | 6.8 | +0.2 |
| Turnout | | 8,900 | 84.6 | +1.8 |
| Registered electors | | 10,514 | | |
| Conservative hold | | Swing | +0.1 | |

=== Elections in the 1880s ===
General election 1886: Southport
| Party | Candidate | Votes | % | ±% |
|---|---|---|---|---|
| Conservative | George Curzon | 3,723 | 53.3 | +4.4 |
| Liberal | George Augustus Pilkington | 3,262 | 46.7 | −4.4 |
| Majority | | 461 | 6.6 | N/A |
| Turnout | | 6,985 | 82.8 | −4.0 |
| Registered electors | | 8,437 | | |
| Conservative gain from Liberal | | Swing | +4.4 | |

General election 1885: Southport
| Party | Candidate | Votes | % | ±% |
|---|---|---|---|---|
| Liberal | George Augustus Pilkington | 3,741 | 51.1 | |
| Conservative | John Edwards-Moss | 3,581 | 48.9 | |
| Majority | | 160 | 2.2 | |
| Turnout | | 7,322 | 86.8 | |
| Registered electors | | 8,437 | | |
| Liberal win (new seat) | | | | |

== See also ==
- List of parliamentary constituencies in Merseyside

== Sources ==
- Election results, 1950 – 2005
- F. W. S. Craig, British Parliamentary Election Results 1885 – 1918
- F. W. S. Craig, British Parliamentary Election Results 1918 – 1949
