= High Park, Merseyside =

Coordinates: 53.650°N 2.965°W

High Park
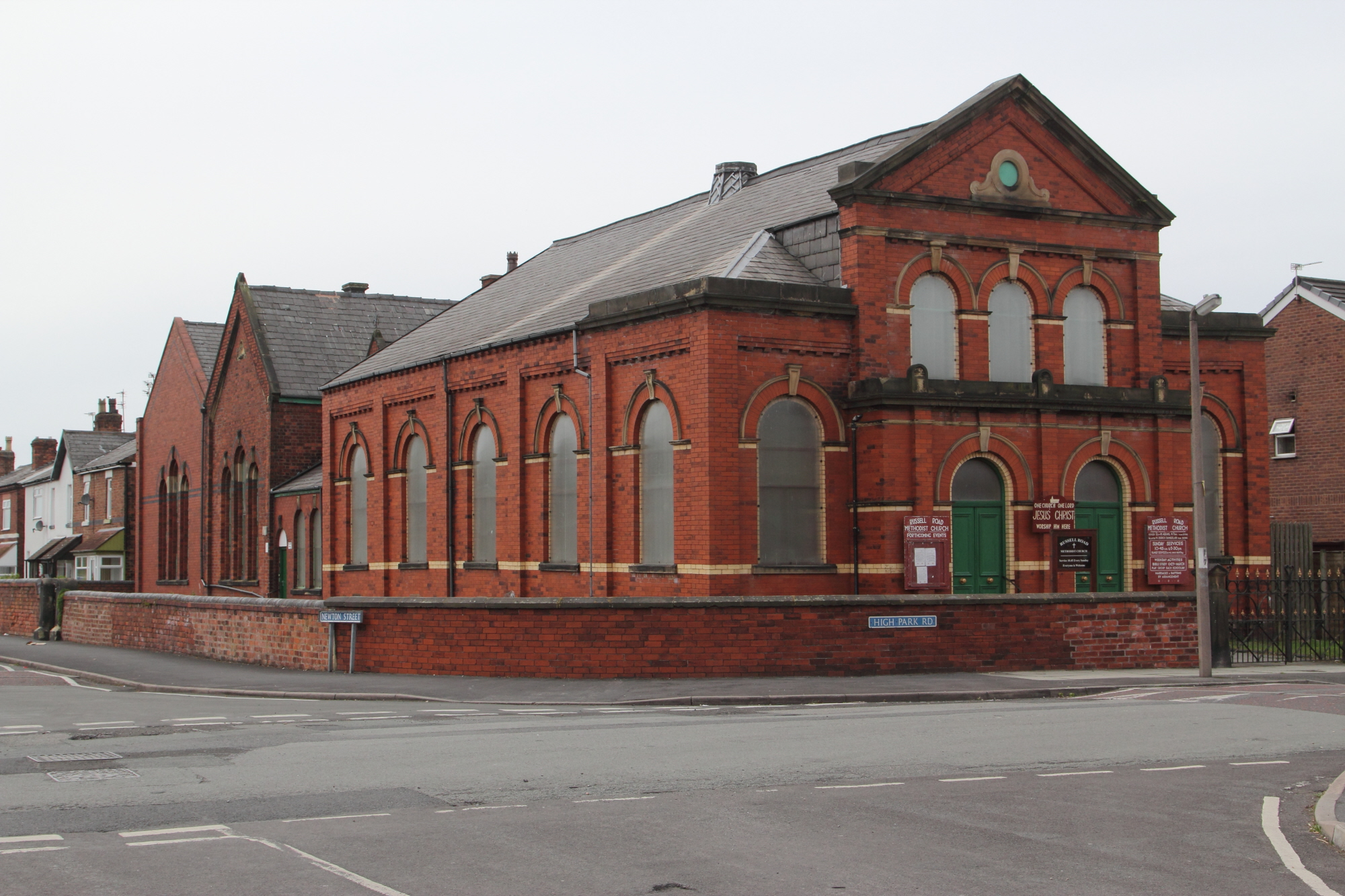
- Russell Road Methodist Church

- Location in Southport Location within Merseyside
- Population: 8,000
  - Density: 4,324
- Metropolitan borough: Sefton
- Metropolitan county: Merseyside
- Region: North West
- Country: England
- Sovereign state: United Kingdom
- Post town: SOUTHPORT
- Postcode district: PR9
- Dialling code: 01704
- Police: Merseyside
- Fire: Merseyside
- Ambulance: North West
- UK Parliament: Southport

High Park is a suburb of Southport, Merseyside, England. It is located on the eastern fringe on the town, just south of Churchtown. High Park Road is within the area of Metropolitan Borough of Sefton who provide services such as refuse collection and are responsible for the collection of council tax. High Park is one of two areas in Norwood (ward), the other being Blowick.
