= Matthew Gordon-Banks =

British intelligence and international relations consultant

Member of Parliament for Southport
- In office 9 April 1992 – 1 May 1997
- Preceded by: Ronnie Fearn
- Succeeded by: Ronnie Fearn

Personal details
- Born: 21 June 1961 (age 65)
- Party: Conservative (until 2004); Liberal Democrats (2004–2016)
- Spouse: Jane Gordon-Banks (née Miller) (m. 1992)
- Children: 2
- Education: Sheffield Hallam University
- Profession: Former Army officer and politician, adviser

Matthew Gordon-Banks (born 21 June 1961) is a British former Conservative Party politician who was elected in 1992 as the Member of Parliament for Southport, but lost his seat in 1997. Gordon-Banks left the Conservative Party in 2004 to join the Liberal Democrats. In 2016, he was suspended from his membership of the Liberal Democrats.

== Early life and career ==
Gordon-Banks graduated with a BA (Hons) in History and Economics from Sheffield Hallam University. He served in the 1st Battalion, 51st Highland Volunteers, from 1979 to 1981 before attending the Royal Military Academy Sandhurst and being commissioned into the Gordon Highlanders in 1981.

After leaving the Army in 1983 with a war disablement pension he worked for Barclays Bank and in 1984 he was elected as Conservative member for the Heswall Ward on Wirral Borough Council, serving as chairman of the Schools Committee from 1985 to 1986 and the Works Committee from 1986 to 1987. He was re-elected with 75% of the vote in 1988 before standing down from the council in 1990. From 1988 to 1989, he worked as private secretary to Cecil Franks, Conservative MP for Barrow and Furness, and from 1989 he was a senior adviser on the Middle-East affairs for LBJ Ltd.

In the 1987 general election, Gordon-Banks was the Conservative candidate for Manchester Central, a safe Labour seat.

== Parliamentary career ==
In 1990, Gordon-Banks was selected to contest Southport and was elected as the constituency's Member of Parliament (MP) 1992, gaining the seat from the Liberal Democrat Ronnie Fearn. In Parliament, he served on the Transport Select Committee from 1992 to 1997. He was also chairman of the Anglo-Venezuela Parliamentary Group and secretary of the Anglo-United Arab Emirates Parliamentary Group from 1993 to 1997. In 1997, Fearn regained the seat from Gordon-Banks.

== Later career ==
Gordon-Banks represented Northleach on Cotswold District Council from 2000 to 2004, sitting as an Independent Conservative and chairing the Overview and Scrutiny Committee for two years. After re-election unopposed in May 2004, he resigned from the council in November of that year. Gordon-Banks received an MBA from the Donald Harrison School of Business at Southeast Missouri State University in 2001. From 2002 to 2006, he was an adviser to the Joint Security Industry Council and in 2004, he joined the Defence Academy of the United Kingdom as a Senior Research Fellow, Middle East and South Asia, a post he held until 2012. From 2006 to 2010, he was a Senior Adviser regarding the Middle East and South Asia in the Advanced Research and Assessment Group of the Defence Academy.

=== Party defection and expulsion ===
In 2004, Gordon-Banks switched party allegiance to the Liberal Democrats, joining the party's Executive Committee in Moray, Scotland.

Gordon-Banks was suspended from the Liberal Democrats in 2016 after an antisemitic Twitter tweet: "Farron's leadership campaign was organised and funded by London Jews" and "I am glad I never had to represent a constituency with a significant Jewish community because [they] are all bloody hard work". Marie van der Zyl, Vice President of the Board of Deputies of British Jews, said, "The comments by Matthew Gordon Banks on Twitter are of very deep concern. He talks about Jews and money and hints at the age-old canard of the 'Jewish conspiracy'. He must urgently clarify and apologise for his comments, otherwise, we would expect the Liberal Democrat Party to invoke disciplinary procedures."

== Personal life ==
Gordon-Banks married Jane Miller in 1992 and has a son and a daughter. He has a home in Charlbury, West Oxfordshire.

In 2017 Gordon-Banks was jailed for crashing his Jaguar into a camper occupied by a 71-year-old woman, for driving his motor vehicle at over twice the drink-drive limit and without insurance. In February 2017 Gordon-Banks was banned from the roads for driving whilst over the alcohol limit. In both cases his defence pled PTSD in mitigation.

Parliament of the United Kingdom
Preceded by Ronnie Fearn	Member of Parliament for Southport; 1992–1997	Succeeded by Ronnie Fearn
