= Southport Offshore Rescue Trust =

Independent lifeboat charity in Merseyside, England

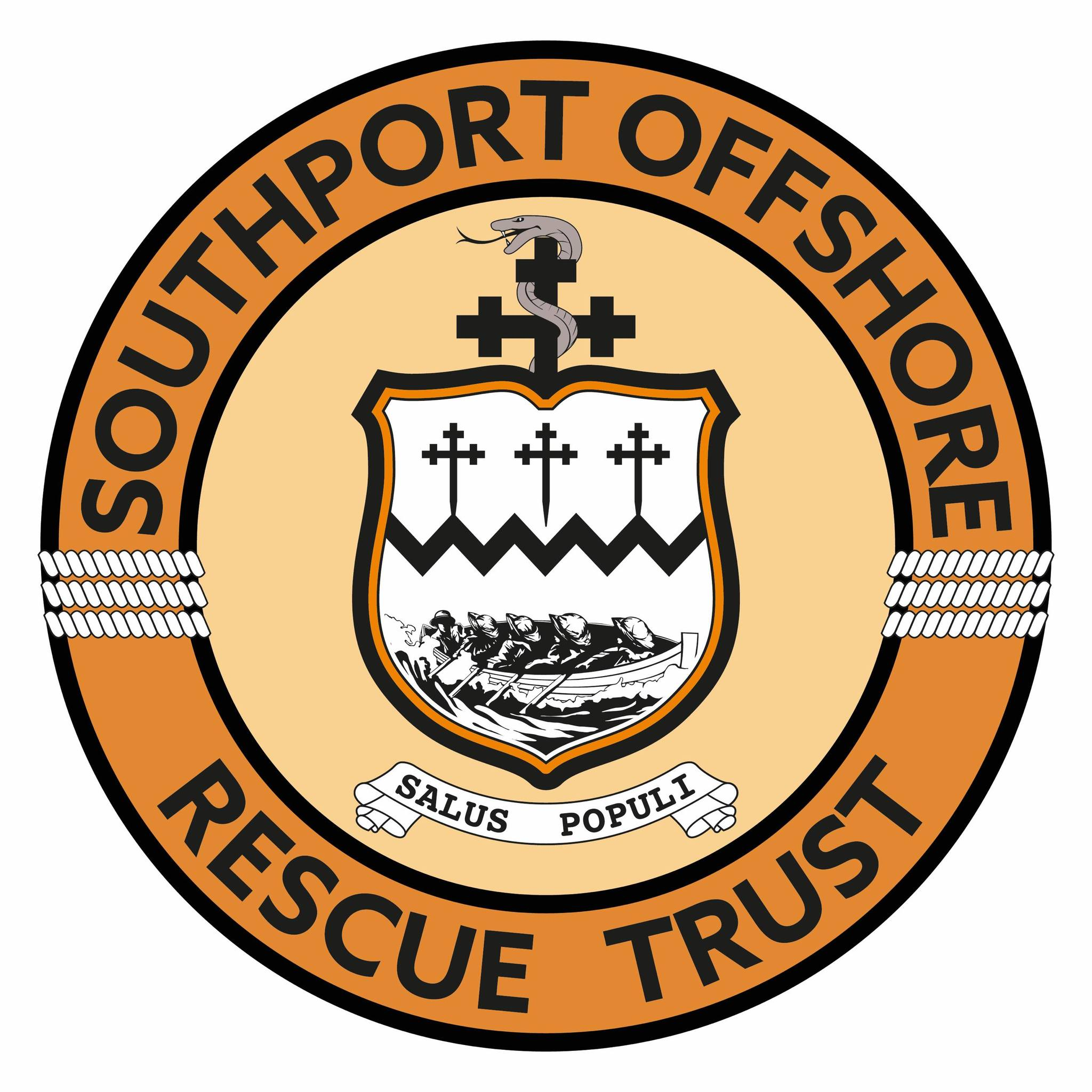
- Founded: 1988
- Founder: Kathleen Wilson
- Type: Search and rescue Charity
- Registration no.: "Southport Offshore Rescue Trust, registered charity no. 1146805". Charity Commission for England and Wales.
- Location: Southport Lifeboat Station, Marine Drive, Southport, Merseyside, PR8 1SD United Kingdom
- Region served: River Mersey to the River Ribble, and up to 25 miles offshore, including Southport Marine Lake.
- Employees: 0
- Volunteers: 40
- Website: http://www.southport-lifeboat.org.uk

Southport Offshore Rescue Trust (SORT) is the registered charity that runs the Southport Lifeboat, an independent marine and land based search and rescue organisation on the Sefton coastline.

Independent of the RNLI, the Trust relies on donations and fundraising to support itself to provide a first class life saving service in an area of coast and water covering between the River Mersey to the River Ribble, and up to 25 mi (40 km) offshore, including Southport Marine Lake.

It is one of many Independent lifeboats in Britain and Ireland not supported by the RNLI.

The Southport Lifeboat have helped in the safe return of over 400 people since being formed in 1988, and aim to give the crew the best equipment possible to help save lives on the coastline.

The crew currently operate two lifeboats, three ATV quad bikes, Drones, mud rescue equipment and a land based search team.

The Southport Offshore Rescue Trust has declared facility status for its Lifeboats, Quads and Mud Rescue with UK Coastguard.

In January 2022, the new Southport Lifeboat Station became operational and the old lifeboat house was closed.

== History ==
For a detailed history of the Southport Lifeboat service, please visit Southport Lifeboat Station.

=== Early history ===
Southport Lifeboat earliest service was crewed and organized by local fishermen, was established in 1812 by the Southport Lifeboat Society, operating until 1817.

The Southport Marine Fund, established in 1816 was established by the exertions of the Rev. Gilbert Ford, Rector.” The fund made awards to fishermen “for saving lives and property in the case of shipwreck and to give assistance to vessels in distress.” A reward was offered for every life saved or vessel assisted: £2.10s to the first boat reaching the vessel, £2 to the second and £1 1s to the third.

A lifeboat station was re-established in Southport in 1840 by the Liverpool Dock Trust.

=== RNLI in Southport and the Mexico Disaster ===
Management of the Southport lifeboat station was taken over by the Royal National Lifeboat Institution (RNLI) in 1860.

9 December 1886 saw the Southport and St Anne's lifeboats disaster, the worst RNLI loss, when all 13 crewmen of the St Annes lifeboat Laura Janet, and 14 of 16 crew of the Southport lifeboat Eliza Fernley, were lost whilst attending the vessel Mexico.

=== Closure by RNLI in 1925 ===
The station was closed in 1925 by the RNLI.

The Lifeboat house was used by the council for storage and Southport was provided lifeboat cover by New Brighton to the South, and Lytham to the North.

=== Reformation as Independent Lifeboat ===
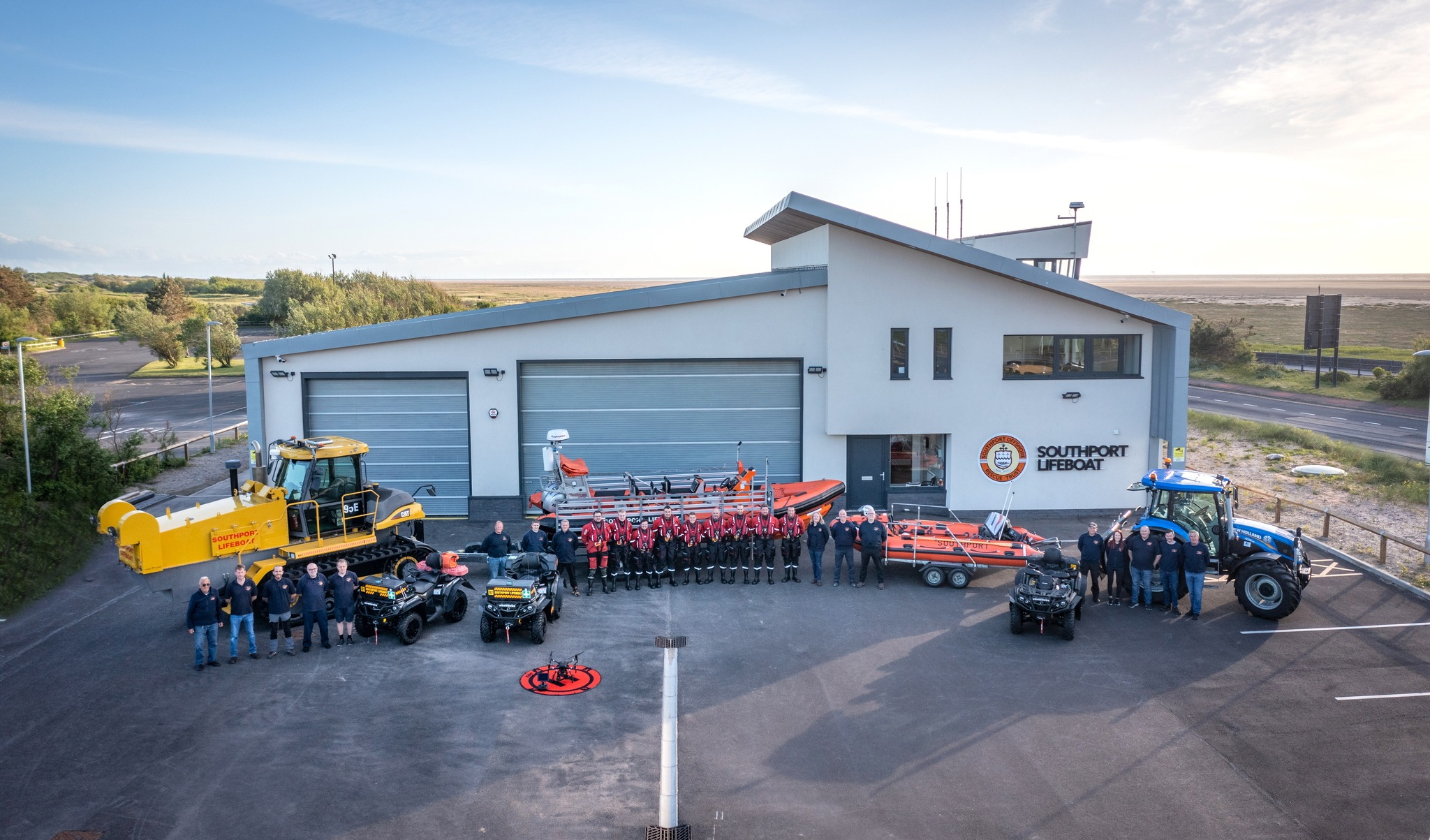
Southport Lifeboat Station and assets 2022

Southport Lifeboat was reformed following accidents off the coast where local men lost their lives. After the accidents in 1987, bereaved relatives started a campaign to bring a lifeboat back to Southport. In December 1988 the first boat since 1925 came on station at Southport.

In January 2022, the new Southport Lifeboat Station opened on Marine Drive. The building was dedicated to founder of the charity, Kath Wilson, in respect of her fundraising efforts at the Lifeboat Shop which paid for the majority of the building.

== Southport Offshore Rescue Trust lifeboats ==
Name	On Station	Class	Comments
Geoff Clements	1988–1995	6m Carson	
Bessie Worthington	1995–2007	6.6m Delta RIB	
Unnamed	2005–2016	D-class (EA16)	Previously RNLI D-437 Jill Gatti
Heather White	2007–	VT Halmatic Arctic 24 RIB	
Christopher Taylor	2016–	D-class (IB1)	Built new by RNLI Inshore Lifeboat Centre for SORT

== Bibliography ==
- Booth, J.H. Lawson (1949). A History of the Southport Lifeboats.
- Porter, Katherine. The Evolution of the Southport Lifeboat.
- Bland, E. (1903). Annals of Southport and district. A chronological history of North Meols from Alfred the Great to Edward VII.
