= Southport Lifeboat Station =

Lifeboat station in Merseyside, England

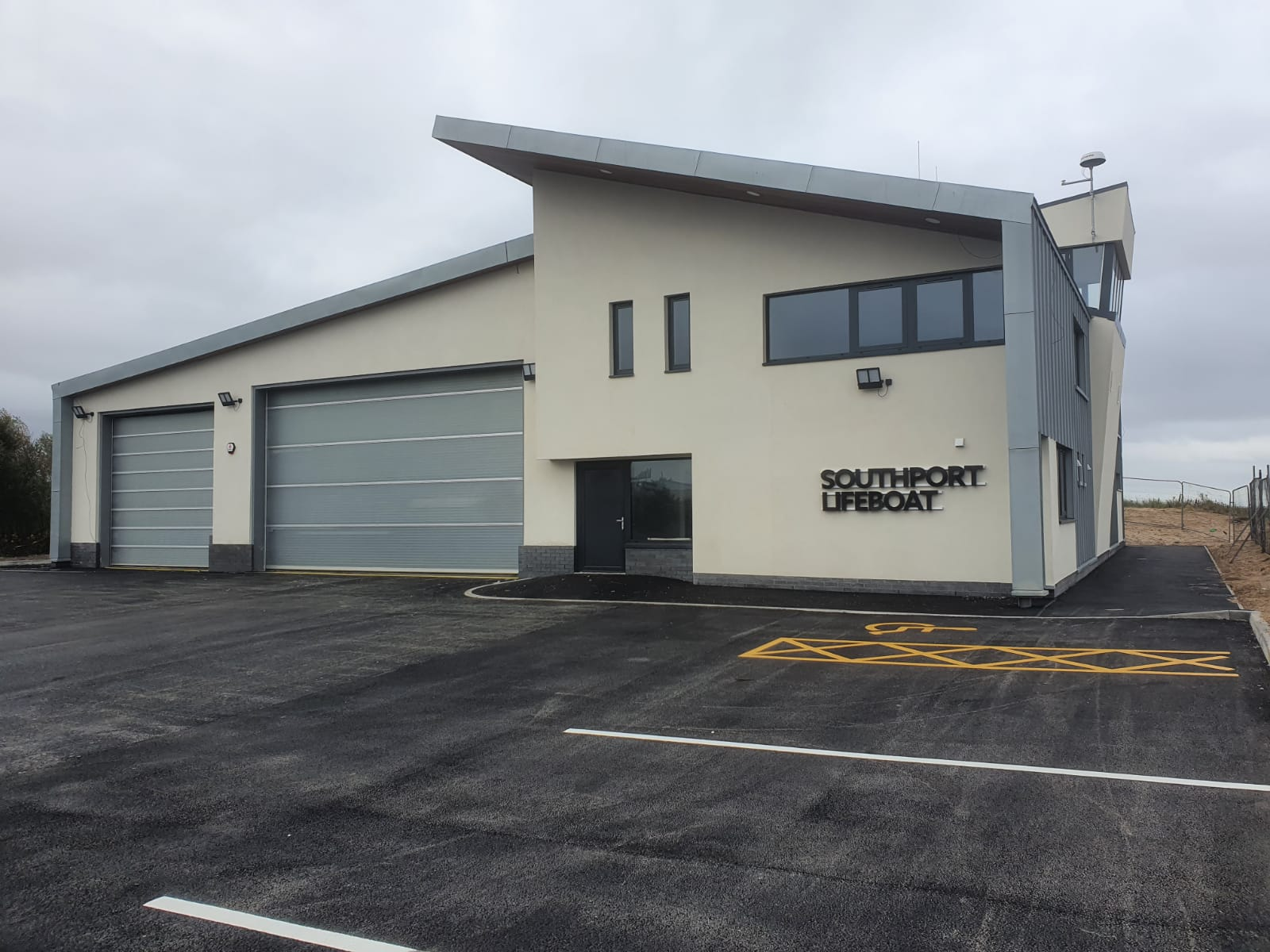
- Southport Lifeboat Station 2022

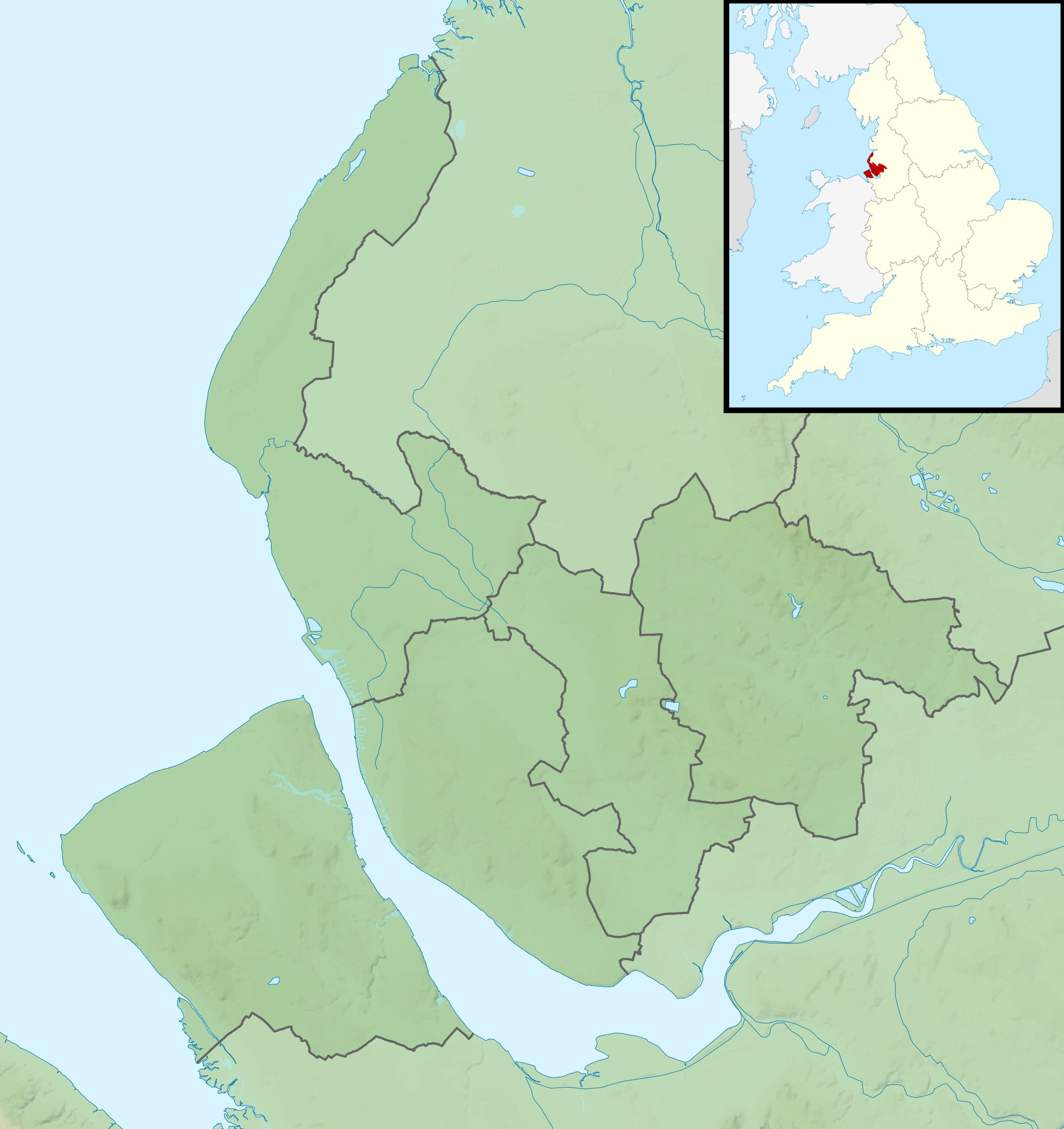
- Location within Merseyside

General information
- Status: Operational
- Type: Lifeboat Station
- Location: Marine Drive,, Southport, Merseyside, PR8 1SD, England
- Coordinates: 53°38′51.6″N 3°01′19.5″W
- Opened: SLS 1812–1817, 1840–1860; RNLI 1860–1925; SORT 1988–

Website
- Southport Lifeboat

Southport Lifeboat Station is located in the Victorian seaside town of Southport, situated to the south of the River Ribble estuary, historically in the county of Lancashire, now Merseyside. It is operated by the Southport Offshore Rescue Trust.

A lifeboat was first stationed at Southport by the Southport Lifeboat Society (SLS) in 1812, but was removed from service by 1817 as it was deemed unsafe. A new boat was provided in 1840.

Management of the station was passed to the Royal National Lifeboat Institution (RNLI) on 2 August 1860. The station operated under the RNLI until 1925, when it was closed due to the silting up of the River Ribble. The Southport and St Anne's lifeboats disaster of 1886 occurred during that period.

Following loss of multiple lives along the coast at Southport during the 1980s, there were campaigns for a new lifeboat at Southport in 1987. A new independent lifeboat operated by the Southport Offshore Rescue Trust began service in December 1988.

== History ==
=== Southport Lifeboat Society 1812–1860 ===
In 1812, the Southport Lifeboat Society was established, to provide a lifeboat for Southport, 12 years before the formation of the RNLI. A boat similar to those used by the Liverpool Dock Trustees is thought to have been used, but no specifications of the boat are available. A wooden boathouse was constructed to house the boat. There is only one record of service, on 10 September 1816, when two survivors of 11 crew were rescued from the brig Sutton of Dublin, on passage to Liverpool.

The boat was crewed by local fishermen, and apparently was not well liked. In 1817, the boat, carriage and boathouse were all sold at public auction, raising £30.

During this period, the Southport Marine Fund was established to provide financial rewards to local fishermen who assisted in the rescue of ships in distress.

=== The Rescue 1840-1861 ===
In 1840, Lloyd's agent Lt. H. G. Kellock, RN, recommended that a lifeboat once again be stationed at Southport. With the assistance of local businessman Caesar Lawson, £40 was raised. Further donations from Lloyds, and £50 from the Liverpool Dock Trustees and the Southport Marine Fund, a boat, of a design by Thomas Costain specifically for the shallow waters of the River Mersey, was ordered from Cato of Liverpool. Lt. Kellock was appointed Honorary Secretary, and the boat, named Rescue, was housed in a wooden boathouse opposite (what is now) Coronation Walk.

The first service of Rescue came on 26 October 1842, to the Liberty of Caernarfon, on passage from Poole to Liverpool. Driven ashore at Birkdale, the five crew were rescued.

Rescue would serve for 21 years. Service records are incomplete, but it is thought she was launched at least 25 times, rescuing 175 lives.

=== RNLI 1860–1925 ===
In 1860, discussions were held between the RNLI and the Southport Lifeboat Society, and it was agreed that the RNLI would take over management of the station. This usually involved some agreement for funds to be raised locally. A new 32-foot self-righting 'pulling and sailing' (P&S) lifeboat, one with oars and sails, costing £202, was ordered from Forrestt of Limehouse, London, and a 40-foot brick boathouse was constructed by William Wright and Sons, costing £150. On 7 September 1861, a grand procession took place, and the lifeboat was hauled through the town to the boathouse. The boat, and all her equipment, had been funded by a gift of Mr J. Knowles of Bolton, and was named Jessie Knowles after his youngest daughter.

On 20 September 1863, Jessie Knowles launched to the aid of the barque St. Lawrence, on passage from Liverpool to Cardiff, when she ran aground on Salthouse Bank. In a full westerly gale, the lifeboat took 2½ hours to reach the vessel. The captain, chief officer and two crewmen stayed aboard, but the captains wife and child, and 12 crew, were rescued. The boat was eventually recovered to Lytham, with the help of both Southport and Lytham lifeboat crews.

The Jessie Knowles was launched to the aid of the barque Tamworth on 29 October 1863, on passage from Liverpool to Havana, when she ran aground on Trunk Hill Bank. Three hours hard rowing were needed to reach the vessel, but eventually the lifeboat got alongside, and 17 crew were rescued.

In 1886, Southport Council wanted to further develop the promenade, and discussions were held between the RNLI and the council, with a view to relocating the lifeboat station to a site at the south end of the promenade.

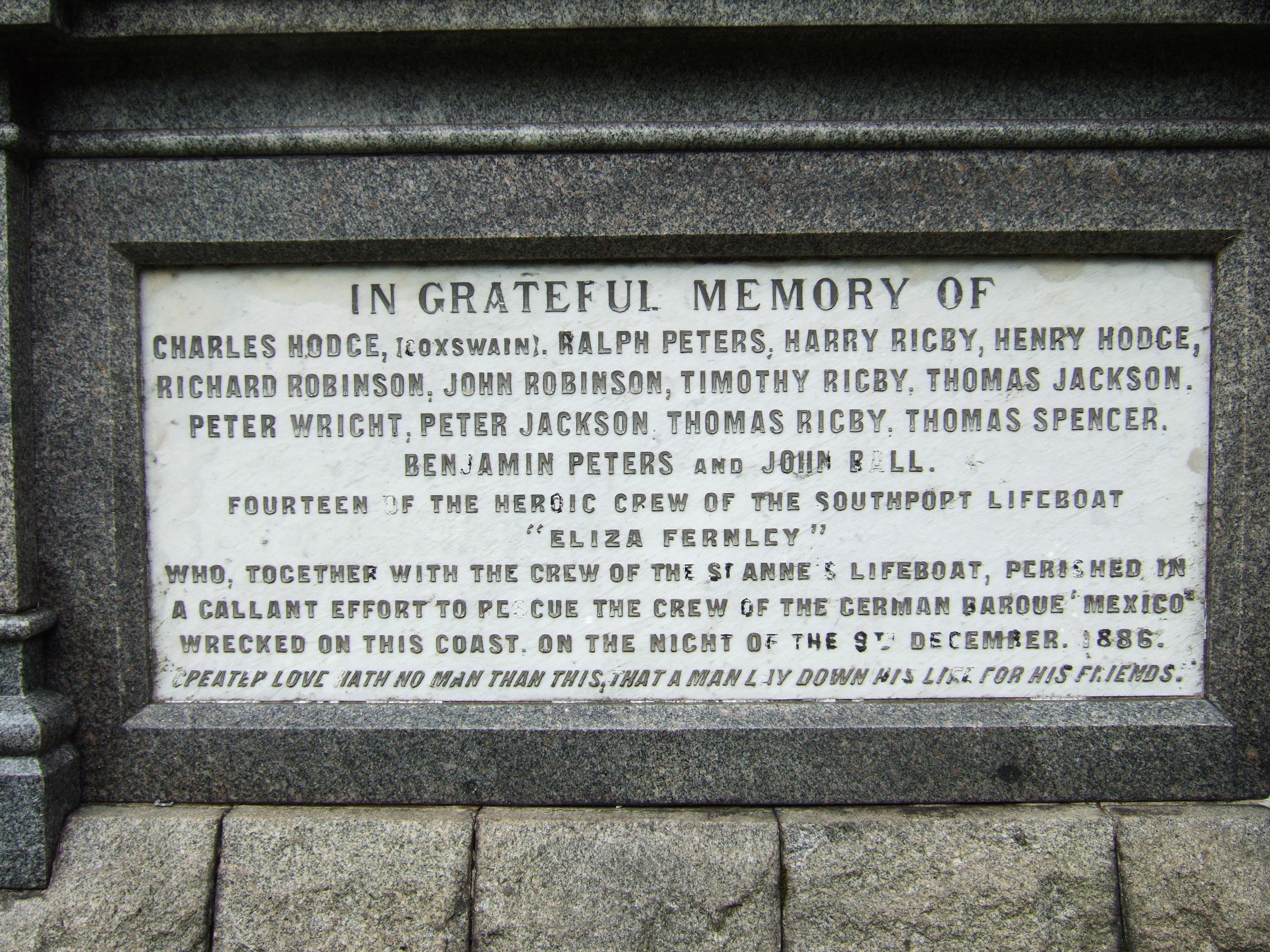
Southport lifeboat disaster memorial

On the 9 December 1886, the German barque Mexico was driven ashore at Trunk Hill Brow, Ainsdale. Much has been documented about the Mexico disaster. All 13 crewmen aboard the St Annes lifeboat Laura Janet, and 14 of 16 crew of the Southport lifeboat Eliza Fernley, were lost, the greatest ever disaster for the RNLI. As it turned out, the Southport and St Annes boats need not have launched at all, as all 12 crew aboard the Mexico had already been rescued by the Lytham lifeboat. No medals or commendations were received from the RNLI at Southport, but the station was awarded a silver medal by the Societe des Sauveteurs, Medailles du Gouvernement de la Gironde, for courage and devotion to duty.

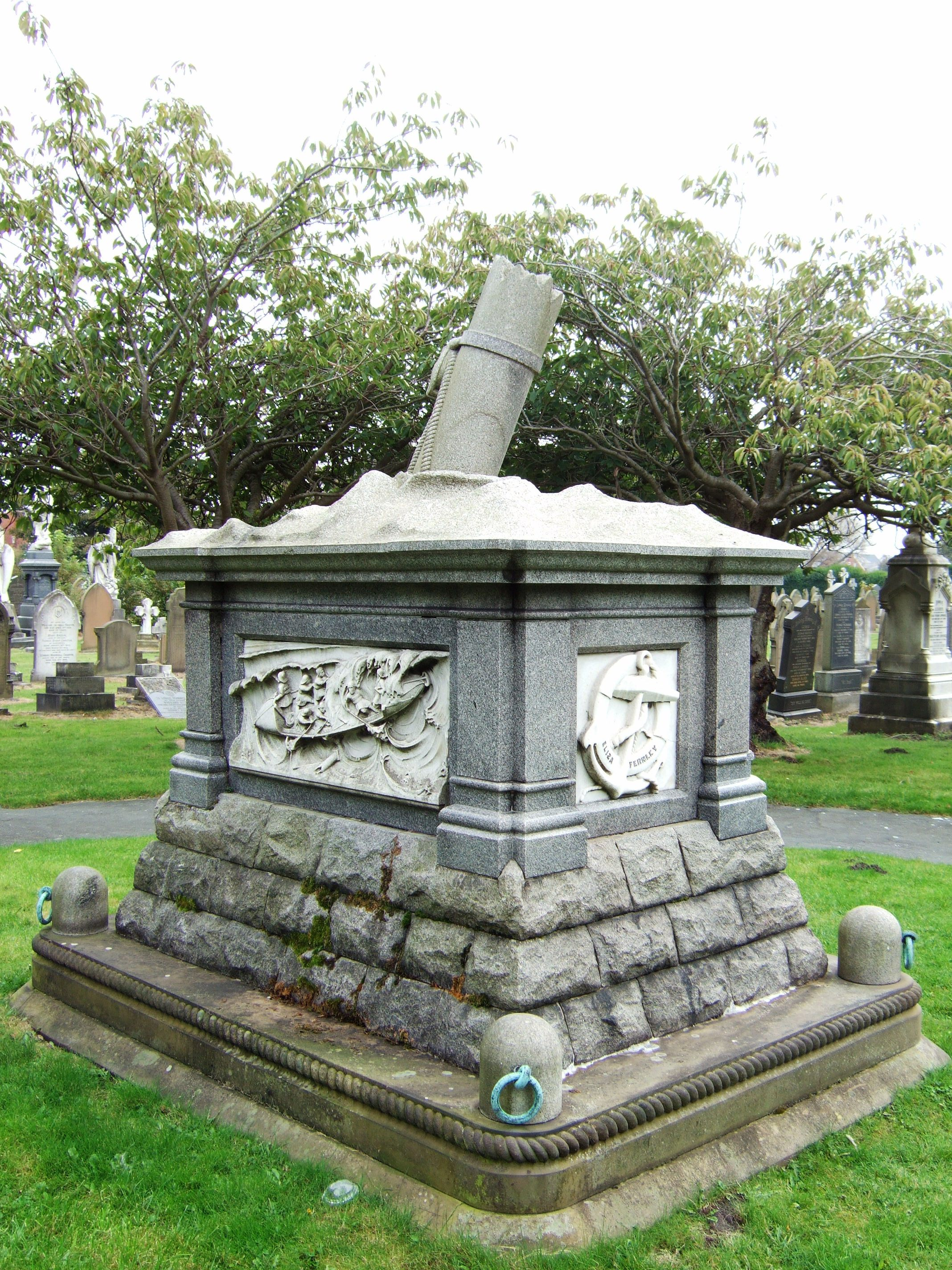
Southport lifeboat disaster memorial, Duke Street Cemetery, Southport

The Eliza Fernley was returned to RNLI HQ, and subsequently broken up. The Southport lifeboat was quickly replaced, with a new 34-foot (10-oared) self-righting lifeboat arriving on station on 22 December 1886. The boat was provided from funds from an anonymous gentleman from Lancashire, via the New Brighton branch of the RNLI, and was named Mary Anna (ON 72).

Mary Anna would later be housed in a new boathouse, which was completed in 1887, and located at the southern end of the promenade. The boathouse survives to this day. In the following 18 years on station, Mary Anna would be launched just twice.

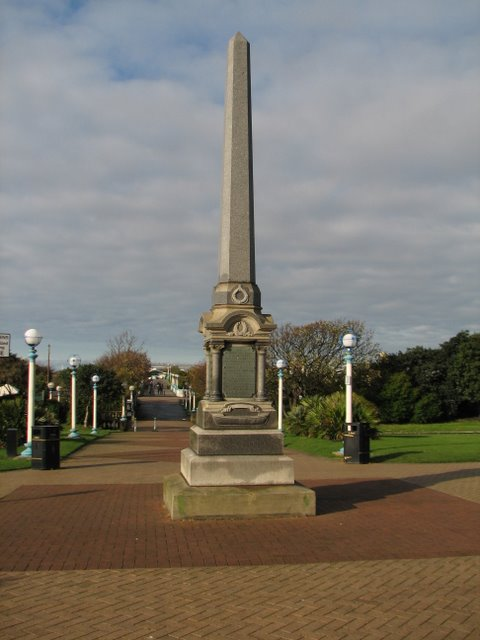
Southport lifeboat monument, Southport promenade

After the Mexico disaster, the crew requested a bigger sailing lifeboat, and a second station was established, with a 42-foot 6in long non-self-righting Watson-class (P&S) lifeboat, moored at the end of the pier. Built by the Barrow Naval Company, the boat was sailed down to Southport in June 1888. Funded from a gift of £750 from two local philanthropists, the Misses MacRae, at a ceremony on the 28 June, the boat was named Edith and Annie (ON 208). Later that same day, ceremonies would be held to unveil the memorials constructed to remember the Mexico Disaster.

Edith and Annie was the much preferred boat, and would launch nine times in 14 years, and save 12 lives. In July 1902, she was immediately withdrawn, when found to be unfit for service. It would be two years before she was replaced, by the John Harling (ON 518), another Watson-class lifeboat, which arrived on 18 June 1904. Six months later, the Mary Anna was withdrawn after 18-years service, and the No. 1 station closed. A reserve lifeboat, The Three Brothers (ON 241), built in 1889 and formerly at Whitelink Bay, would be placed at the promenade boathouse, to be used for demonstration purposes.

The last effective service of Southport lifeboat John Harling, was to the aid of the steamship Chrysopolis of Genoa on 21 February 1918. The vessel had run aground on Horse Bank some days earlier, but all attempts to re-float the vessel failed. When the weather deteriorated, the vessel broke her back, and the lifeboat rescued the 42 people aboard.

By 1925, silting of the coast was so serious, that the lifeboat could only be launched in a 2-hour window every high tide. As a result, it was decided to close the station. Southport Lifeboat closed on 30 April 1925.

John Harling (ON 518) was sold locally for use as a pleasure boat. In 1927, the demonstration boat The Three Brothers was relocated to Cork, and the boathouse was returned to the landowner.

=== Southport Offshore Rescue Trust 1988–present ===
Following a series of accidents off the coast in which several people lost their lives, bereaved relatives launched a campaign to restore a lifeboat service to Southport. By December 1988, the Southport Offshore Rescue Trust was operating the first lifeboat in Southport since 1925.

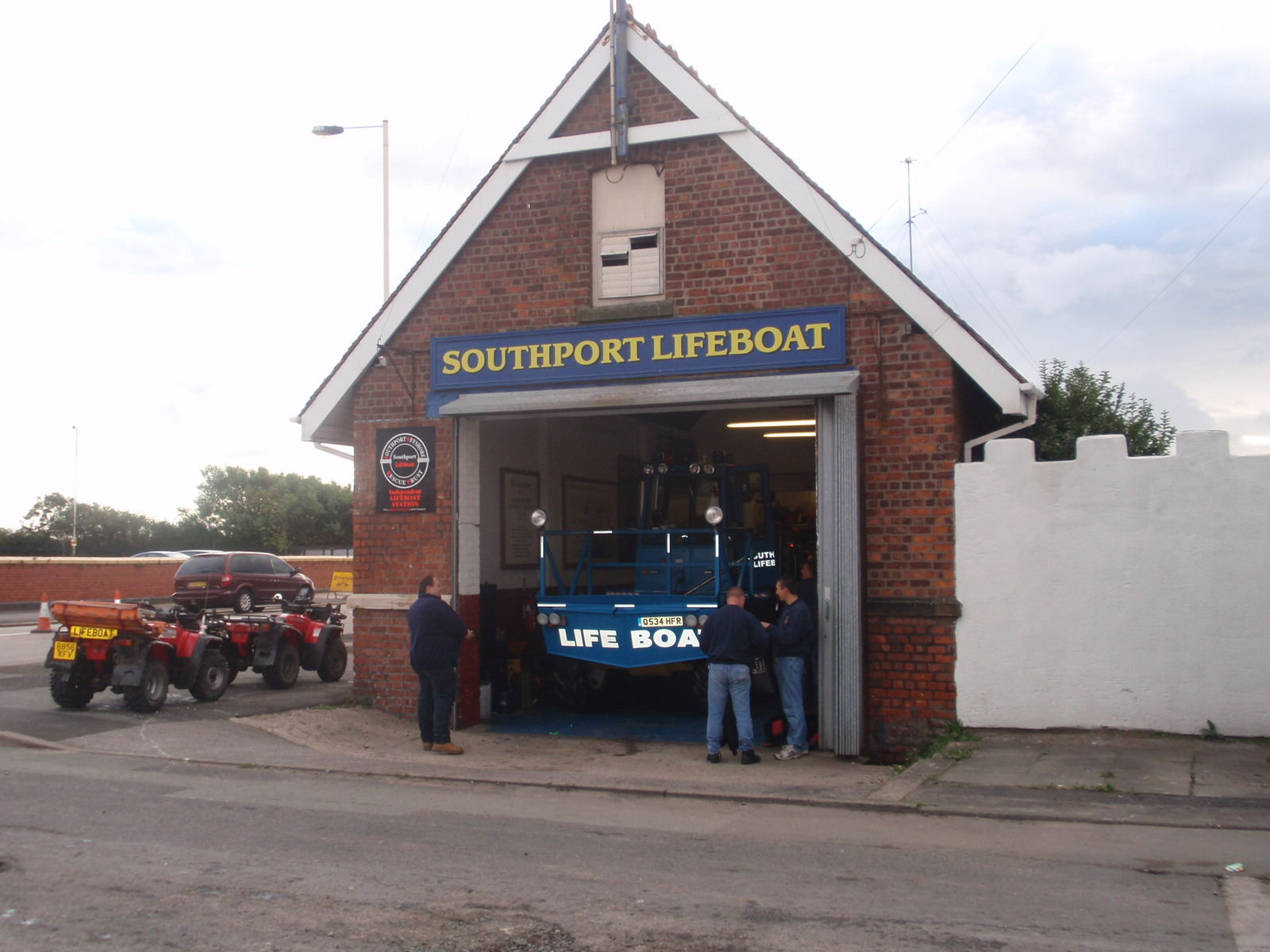
Former RNLI Lifeboat House, built 1887

After over 60 years as a council store, the 1887 RNLI lifeboat house was brought back into service, and would serve as the home of the Southport Offshore Rescue Trust from 1988 until 2022.

The new lifeboat was a 6 m (20 ft) Carson Rigid inflatable boat (RIB), originally equipped with twin 40 hp (30 kW) Mariner outboard engines. In 1995, it was refitted with a single 85 hp (63 kW) Suzuki engine and a 10 hp (7.5 kW) auxiliary engine. Designed with self-righting capability and integral fuel tanks, the boat could reach a top speed of approximately 30 knots. It was named Geoff Clements, in honor of one of the young men who lost their lives in the 1987 accidents. His mother, Kathleen Wilson, was a founding member of the charity and played a key role in raising the funds necessary to acquire the vessel.

In 1995, the Bessie Worthington, a 6.6 m (22 ft) RIB built by Delta Power Services in Stockport, entered service for the Southport Lifeboat. Designed to meet SOLAS safety standards, the vessel featured full self-righting capability and was equipped with Delta-supplied electrics and navigation systems, including GPS, radio, echo sounder, and EPIRB.

During the years following the millennium two quad bikes and a former RNLI D-class Inshore lifeboat, were added to the equipment. The quads provide rapid response and enable efficient searches across the large beach and dune areas. The D-class served as a vital training platform and was useful for searching the shallow waters north of Southport Pier or in Southport Marine Lake.

In early 2005, a campaign was launched to replace the Bessie Worthington, setting a £120,000 target for a VT Halmatic Arctic 24 lifeboat, similar to one used by Sidmouth Lifeboat. By September 2006, sufficient funds were raised to commission its construction. However, rising costs increased the final price to approximately £140,000 by delivery. The Heather White entered service in May 2007.

With the opening of a charity shop in Birkdale in 2005, the Southport Lifeboat have been able to continually update the kit available for the crew.

The engines on the Heather White were upgraded from twin 135 hp (101 kW) to twin 150 hp (110 kW) outboards in 2011.

In 2016, the Trust purchased a new D-class (IB1) inshore lifeboat from the RNLI, naming it Christopher Taylor, in memory of a Southport man who drowned in the River Avon at Bath.

The Honda ATV quad bikes were replaced every three years to prevent corrosion issues. In 2018, the Trust switched manufacturer to Can-Am ATVs, adding a third quad in January 2021.

The new Southport Lifeboat Station opened on Marine Drive in January 2022. It was dedicated to charity founder Kathleen Wilson in recognition of her fundraising efforts, primarily through the lifeboat shop, which funded most of the building.

In August 2025, it was announced that a new FRC903 lifeboat had been ordered to replace the Heather White. The new vessel, based on the Nikolaas class used by the KNRM, is being built in the Netherlands by Habbeke Shipyard and is due to arrive at station in 2026.

== Station honours ==
The following are awards made at Southport.

- RNIPLS Silver Medal

William Rockcliffe, Coxswain – 1852

- RNLI Silver Medal

William Rockcliffe, Coxswain – 1873 (Second-Service Clasp)

- Silver Medal, awarded by King Carl XV of Sweden and Norway

William Rockcliffe, Coxswain – 1863

  - Silver Medal, awarded by the Societe des Sauveteurs, Medailles du Gouvernement de la Gironde,
  - for courage and devotion to duty

Southport Lifeboat Station – 1886

- Liverpool Shipwreck & Humane Society Certificates

Robert Forshaw, Keith Porter, Neil Henshall, Coxswains – 1992

- Queen Elizabeth II Golden Jubilee Medal

Southport Lifeboat Crew – 2002

- Queen Elizabeth II Diamond Jubilee Medal

Southport Lifeboat Crew – 2012

- Queen Elizabeth II Platinum Jubilee Medal

Southport Lifeboat Crew – 2022

- King Charles III Coronation Medal

Southport Lifeboat Crew – 2024

== Roll of honour ==
In memory of those lost whilst serving Southport lifeboat.

- Lifeboat Eliza Fernley, capsized on service to the Mexico, 9 December 1886

Charles Hodge, Coxswain (60)
Ralph Peters, Second Coxswain (60)
John Ball (26)
Henry Hodge (43)
Peter Jackson (53)
Thomas Jackson (27)
Benjamin Peters (24)

Harry Rigby (27)
Thomas Rigby (58)
Timothy Rigby (28)
John Robinson (19)
Richard Robinson (25)
Thomas Spencer (47)
Peter Wright (24)

- Lost when their small boat capsized, while attempting to change the lifeboat moorings, 26 June 1899

William Robinson, Coxswain (64)
John Robinson (44)
Frederick Rigby (37)

== Southport lifeboats ==
=== Southport Lifeboat Society ===
Name	Built	On station	Class	Comments
Unknown	1812	1812−1817	Liverpool	(Note: Lifeboat of unknown dimensions and manufacturer.)
Rescue	1840	1840−1861	30-foot Liverpool	(Note: 30-foot x 8-foot 3in (10-oared) Liverpool-class non-self-righting lifeboat, funded by the North Moels Marine fund, built by Cato of Liverpool, costing £120.)

=== RNLI ===
==== No. 1 Station (Promenade) ====
ON (Note: ON is the RNLI's Official Number of the boat.)	Name	Built	On station	Class	Comments
Pre-378	Jessie Knowles	1860	1861−1874	32-foot Peake Self-righting (P&S)	(Note: 32-foot x 8-foot (10-oared) Peake-class self-righting (P&S) lifeboat, gift of Mr J. Knowles of Eagley Bank, Lancashire, built by Forrestt of Limehouse, London, costing £202.)
Pre-576	Eliza Fernley	1873	1874−1886	34-foot Self-righting (P&S)	(Note: 34-foot x 8-foot 5in (10-oared) self-righting (P&S) lifeboat, legacy of Mr J. Fernley of Southport, built by Woolfe of Shadwell, London, costing £313.)
72	Mary Anna	1886	1886−1904	34-foot Self-righting (P&S)	(Note: 34-foot x 8-foot (10-oared) self-righting (P&S) lifeboat, anonymous gift via the New Brighton branch, built by Woolfe of Shadwell, London, costing £336.)
241	The Three Brothers	1889	1905−1927	34-foot Self-righting (P&S)	(Note: 34-foot x 8-foot (10-oared) self-righting (P&S) lifeboat, an anonymous gift, built by D. and W. Henderson and Company of Partick, costing £441 when new.); Reserve lifeboat No. D1, used for display purposes, previously at Whitelink Bay

Station Closed, 1904. Building used to store Display Lifeboat until 1927.
Pre ON numbers are unofficial numbers used by the Lifeboat Enthusiast Society to reference early lifeboats not included on the official RNLI list.

==== No. 2 Station (Pier) ====
ON	Name	Built	On station	Class	Comments
208	Edith and Annie	1888	1888−1902	42-foot 6in Watson (P&S)	(Note: 42-foot 6in x 13-foot 2in (12-oared) Watson-class non-self-righting (P&S) lifeboat, gift of Misses Macrae of Southport, built by Barrow Naval Company, costing £844.)
518	John Harling	1904	1904−1925	43-foot 6in Watson (P&S)	(Note: 43-foot 6in x 13-foot 3in (12-oared) Watson-class non-self-righting (P&S) lifeboat, gift of the Trustees of John Harling, Southport, built by Thames Ironworks, of Blackwall, London, costing £2,099.)

=== Southport Offshore Rescue Trust ===
Name	On station	Class	Comments
Geoff Clements	1988–1995	6 m Carson	
Bessie Worthington	1995–2007	6.6m Delta RIB	
Unnamed	2005–2016	D-class (EA16)	Previously RNLB Jill Gatti (D-437)
Heather White	2007–	VT Halmatic Arctic 24 RIB	
Christopher Taylor	2016–	D-class (IB1)	

== See also ==
- Independent lifeboats in Britain and Ireland
- List of former RNLI stations
- List of RNLI stations
