= List of buildings in Ireland =

List of notable buildings in Ireland

The following buildings in Ireland that are currently in use are landmarks of historical, cultural or governmental significance. For ruins, see National monuments of Ireland.

- Albert College Building, Dublin, 1851
- Aldborough House and The Lord Amiens Theatre, Dublin, 1795
- American Embassy, Dublin
- Áras an Uachtaráin, Dublin
- Ardbraccan House, County Meath
- Blarney Castle, County Cork
- Busaras, Dublin
- Carton House, County Kildare
- Casino at Marino, Dublin
- Clarion Hotel, Limerick
- Christ Church Cathedral, Dublin
- City Hall, Dublin
- College Green, Dublin
- Convention Centre Dublin
- Courtown Lifeboat Station, County Wexford, 1911
- Custom House, Dublin, 1791
- Dr Steevens' Hospital, Dublin, 1733
- Dublin Castle
- Farmleigh, Irish state guesthouse
- The Four Courts, Dublin
- General Post Office or GPO, Dublin
- Government Buildings, Dublin
- Grand Canal Theatre, Dublin
- Headfort House, Kells, County Meath
- The Incorporated Law Society, previously The Blue Coat School, Blackhall Place, Dublin, 1783
- The Old Parliament House to 1800
- Iveagh House, Dublin
- Kilkenny Castle, Kilkenny
- Kilmainham Jail, Dublin
- King's Inns, Dublin
- Leinster House, Dublin
- Liberty Hall, Dublin
- Malahide Castle, County Dublin
- Mansion House, Dublin
- St. Doulagh's Church, Dublin, built in the 5th century, renovated in the 12th century
- St. Mary's Church, Dublin, 1627
- St. Michan's Church, Dublin, 1095
- Muckross House, County Kerry
- National Aquatic Centre, Dublin
- National Concert Hall, Dublin
- St. Nicholas' Collegiate Church, Galway
- St. Patrick's Cathedral, Dublin
- St. Stephens' Church, Dublin - better known to Dubliners as "The Pepper Canister".
- Powerscourt House and demesne, County Wicklow
- Powerscourt Townhouse Centre, Dublin
- Riverpoint, Limerick
- Russborough House, County Wicklow
- Rotunda Hospital, Dublin, 1757
- The Helix, Glasnevin, Dublin
- Royal Hospital Kilmainham, Dublin
- Thoor Ballylee, County Galway
- Trinity College Dublin

== See also ==
- Market Houses in the Republic of Ireland
- National monuments of Ireland
