= Southport and St Anne's lifeboats disaster =

1886 ship wreck

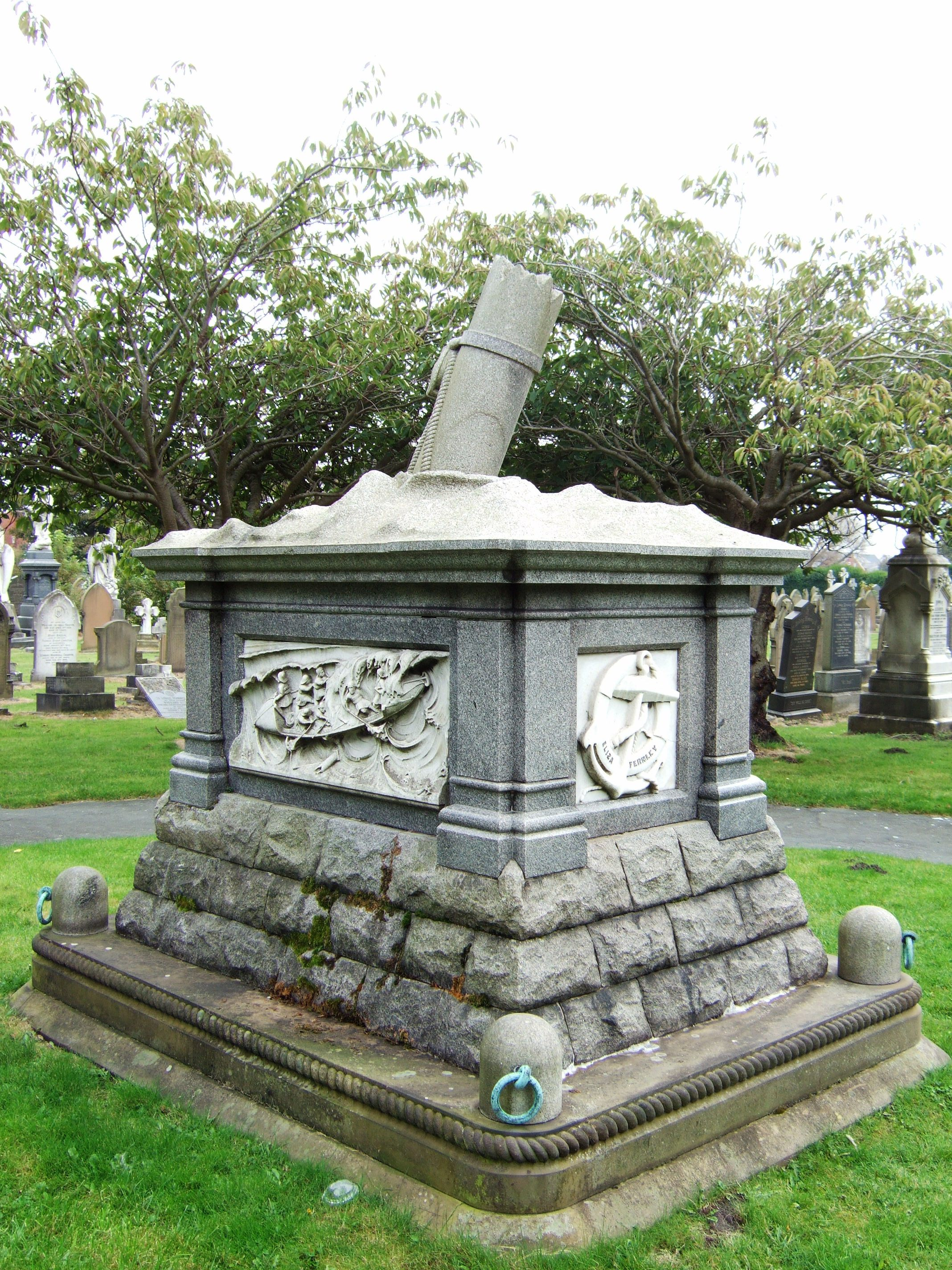
- Southport Cemetery lifeboat memorial
- Date: 9 December 1886
- Location: Southport, England; 53.653°N 3.015°W
- Outcome: 27 lives lost; 2 survivors

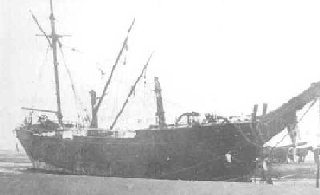
- Mexico beached

History

German Empire
- Name: John Bull (1860–1881); Mexico (1881–1899); Valhalla (1899–1900)
- Owner: Oetling Gebrüder
- Builder: T. R. Oswald, Sunderland
- In service: 1860
- Out of service: 1900
- Home port: Hamburg
- Fate: wrecked in 1900

General characteristics
- Tonnage: 477 NRT
- Length: 150 ft
- Beam: 27 ft
- Height: 17 ft
- Propulsion: sails
- Sail plan: barque
- Crew: 12

The Southport and St Anne's lifeboats disaster occurred on the evening of 9 December 1886, when 27 lifeboat men lost their lives trying to save the crew of the German barque Mexico.

14 of the 16 crew members aboard the Southport lifeboat Eliza Fernley drowned, along with all 13 of the St Annes lifeboat Laura Janet. The 12 crew of the Mexico were rescued by the Lytham lifeboat Charles Biggs. (Note: Sources use the term "veer down", meaning to drop the anchor, then let the boat swing around and drift, or be manoeuvred, controllably towards the target.)

== Disaster ==
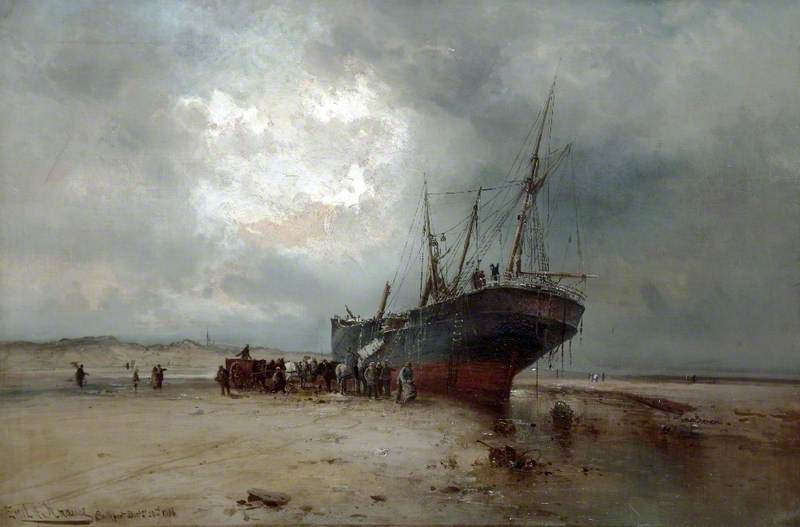
Painting of Mexico being unloaded

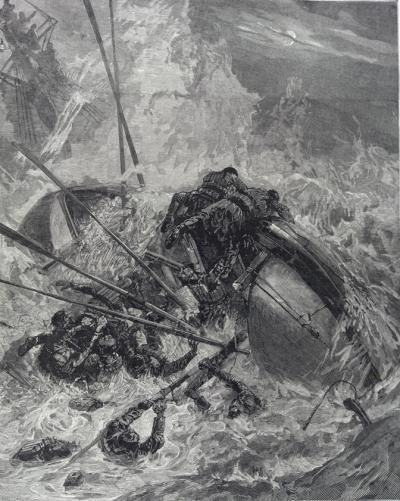
Illustration of the capsizing of the lifeboat Eliza Fernley

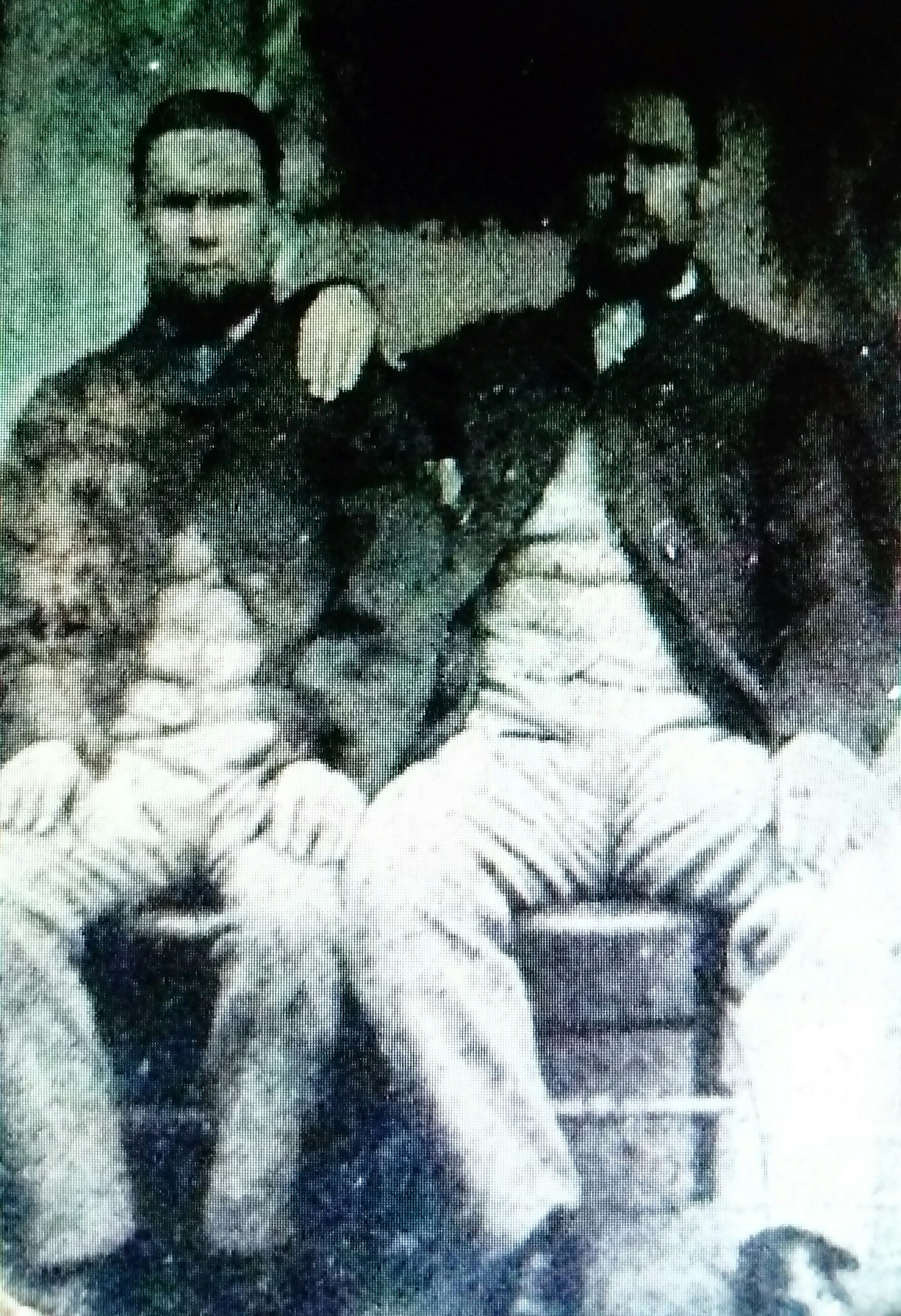
Henry Robinson and John Jackson, the two crew survivors of Southport lifeboat Eliza Fernley, pictured circa 1890

On 9 December 1886, Mexico, a Hamburg-registered barque with cargo bound for Guayaquil, Ecuador, from Liverpool, England, was being driven by a full west-north-westerly gale. The ebb tide was running directly into the wind, considerably increasing the very heavy sea, making it extremely dangerous to boats. Approaching a sandy shore, with two anchors dragging, Captain Burmester ordered the fore and main masts to be cut down to reduce windage. At about 3:00 pm, the anchors held. At 9:00 pm, with the ship drifting again, she showed distress signals. She went aground about three miles west of Southport. Around 9:15, the St Annes lighthouse (Note: Now gone, this was at the junction of Lightburne Avenue and South Promenade.) watchman, alerted by the signals, fired the call-out gun.

At about 10:00 pm, a lifeboat, Eliza Fernley, set off from Southport in response to the distress signals. However, she first had to be hauled three and a half miles south-west on a carriage by horses along the beach towards Ainsdale, to gain the best position for reaching the ship. She was launched at 11:00, watched by a large crowd. The craft reached Mexico at 1:00 am, not knowing that the crew had already been rescued. She was struck by heavy seas and capsized. Two hours later, she was found washed up at Birkdale Sands, near Southport. Fourteen of her sixteen crew had perished. One of them had tried and failed to rescue other comrades who were still trapped under the boat. Four other men from the Southport boat initially survived the disaster but subsequently could not be saved. The two survivors, Henry Robinson and John Jackson, were trapped under the boat after she capsized; they survived only by freeing themselves, swimming out and clinging onto the keel of the boat, then walking miles back to their homes.

At 10:05 pm, the lifeboat Charles Biggs (Note: Confusingly, this was also its recent predecessor's name.) was launched from Lytham, on her maiden rescue. Unlike the other lifeboats involved, she was fitted with four water ballast tanks, which may have saved her. The crew of fifteen rowed for a mile and a half against the wind down the River Ribble estuary, and then sailed south-south-west over the sandbanks to Mexico, arriving at 12:30 am. By that time, Mexico had settled on her beam ends, and the crew had lashed themselves to the mizzen rigging. In the process, three of the lifeboat's oars were broken, and the small craft was filled numerous times with water. They rescued all twelve members of the barque's crew, and returned safely to a cheering crowd at Lytham. Later that morning, they discovered that the St Annes boat had not returned, so they re-launched to seek it, and found it overturned.

Twenty minutes after the Lytham boat was launched, the neighbouring St Annes lifeboat—Laura Janet—was also launched. Her crew rowed her out to five hundred yards, and then hoisted sail, proceeding to two miles off Southport. In the words of Patrick Howarth, author of Lifeboat: In Danger's Hour:

What happened there has never been clearly established. Two red lights were seen at Southport, which may have been signals from the life-boat. All that is known is that at quarter past eleven the next morning the life-boat was found ashore, bottom up, with three dead bodies hanging on the thwarts with their heads downwards. Every man in the crew was lost.

The bodies of the unfortunate lifeboatmen (who were fishermen by trade) were removed from the beaches and laid out in the coach house of the nearby Birkdale Palace Hotel. The coach house was later converted to a public house, being named The Fishermen's Rest, and is reputed to be haunted by the spirits of the dead men.

The disaster is the worst in the history of the Royal National Lifeboat Institution (RNLI), with 27 lifeboat crew lost.

== Aftermath ==
Sixteen women were left widows, and fifty children lost their fathers. A public fund for relief of the widows and orphans was opened, with the RNLI contributing £2,000. Queen Victoria and the German emperor sent their condolences to the families of the lifeboatmen, and contributed to the fund. £30,000 was raised in total.

In Manchester in 1891, local businessman Sir Charles Wright Macara organised the first recorded charity street collection, leading to the first RNLI fundraising flag days.

Following the survival of only the Lytham boat, tests for self-righting led to similar boats being modified with ballast tanks.

In 1925, owing to silting and a lack of shipping, the RNLI withdrew its service in Southport, which left the town with no lifeboat. However, in the late 1980s, after a series of tragedies, local people from Southport started to raise funds and eventually bought a new lifeboat for the town, stationed at the old 1887 RNLI boathouse. The Southport Offshore Rescue Trust is completely independent of the RNLI, and, like the RNLI, it depends entirely on charitable funding.

== Memorials ==
Some of the appeal money raised was used to provide memorials to those killed. The following five memorials are now Grade II listed buildings:

- On St Annes Promenade, as a statue of a lifeboatman looking out to sea
- At St Annes Parish Church churchyard, as a celtic cross
- At Lytham, in the churchyard of St Cuthbert's Church, as a gothic spire
- At Southport in the cemetery, depicting a broken mast protruding from a choppy sea
- An obelisk on Southport Promenade

At Layton cemetery is a monument to one of the St Annes crew, as a celtic cross.

In 2007, an appeal was launched by the Lytham St Annes Civic Society for the restoration of four of the memorials.

Memorials

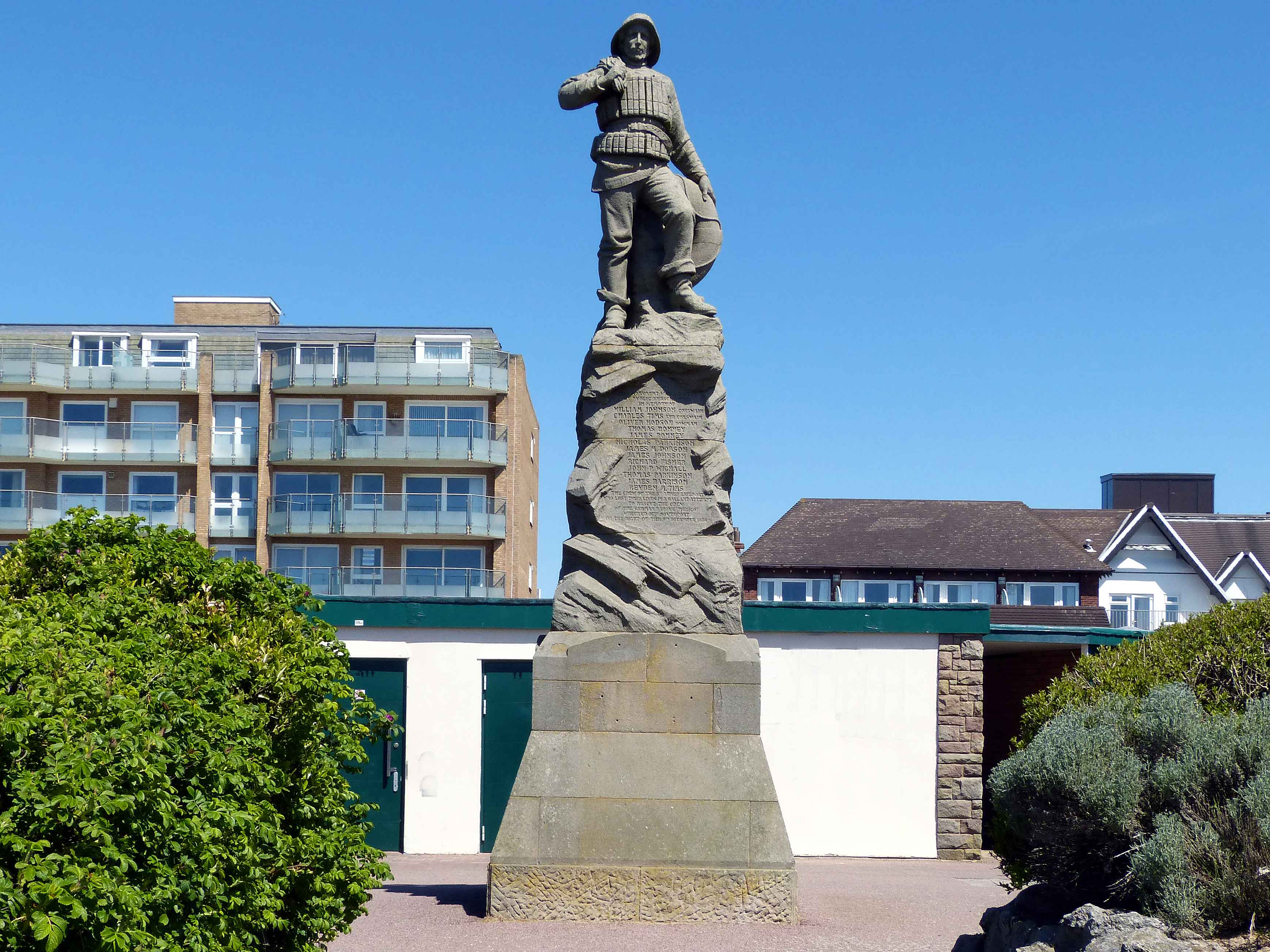
St Annes Promenade

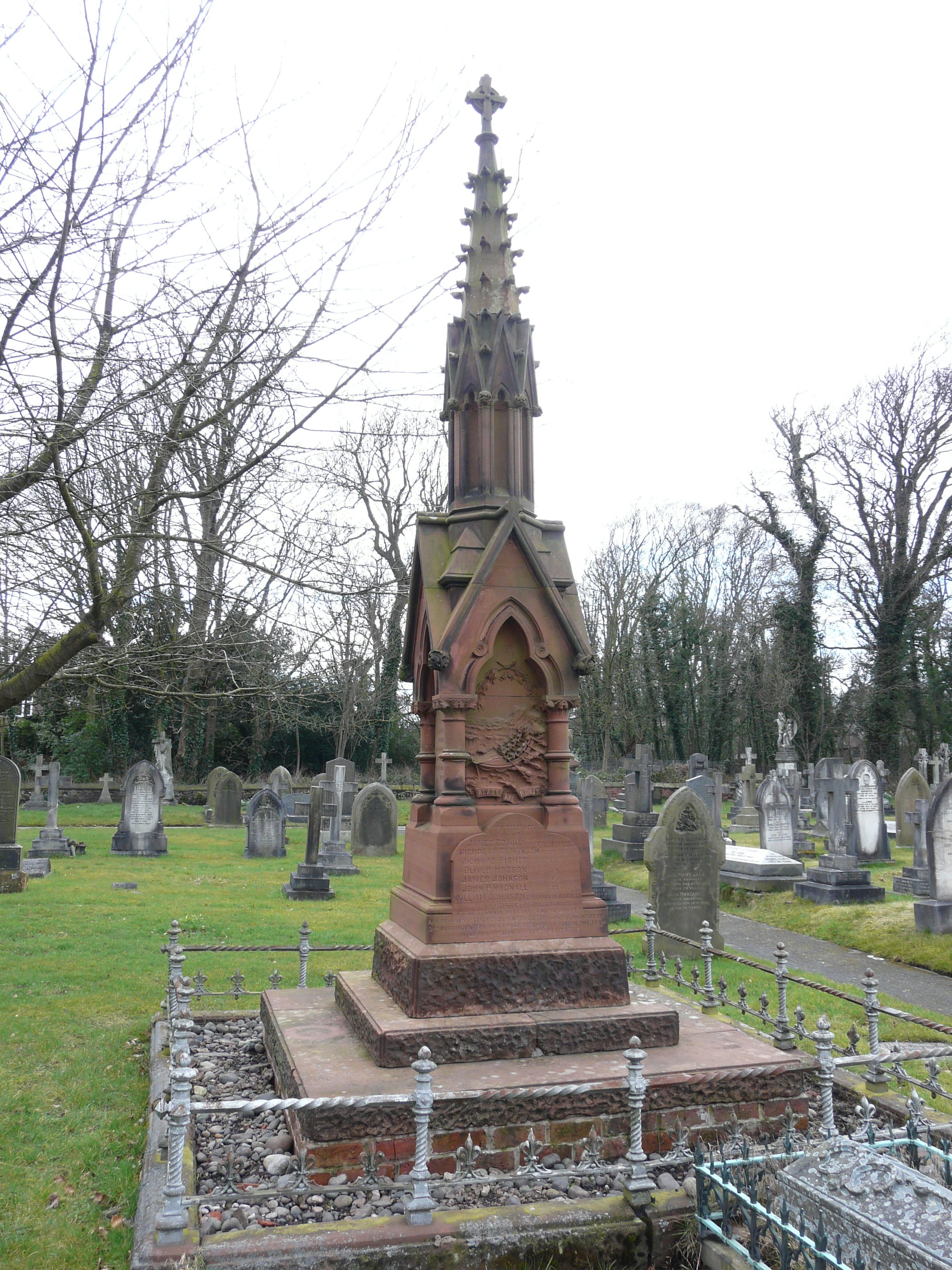
St Cuthbert's Church, Lytham

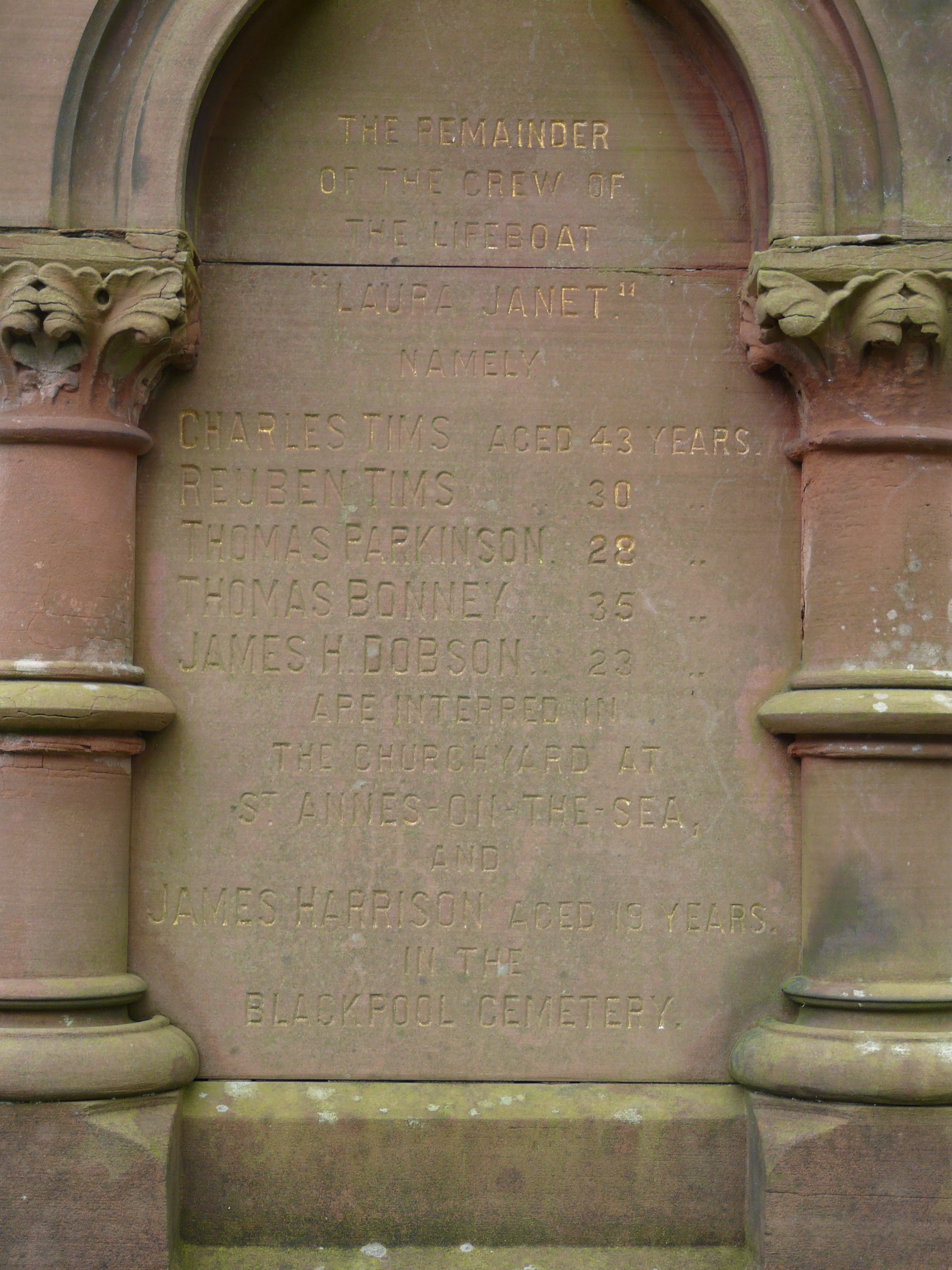
Ditto, west side detail

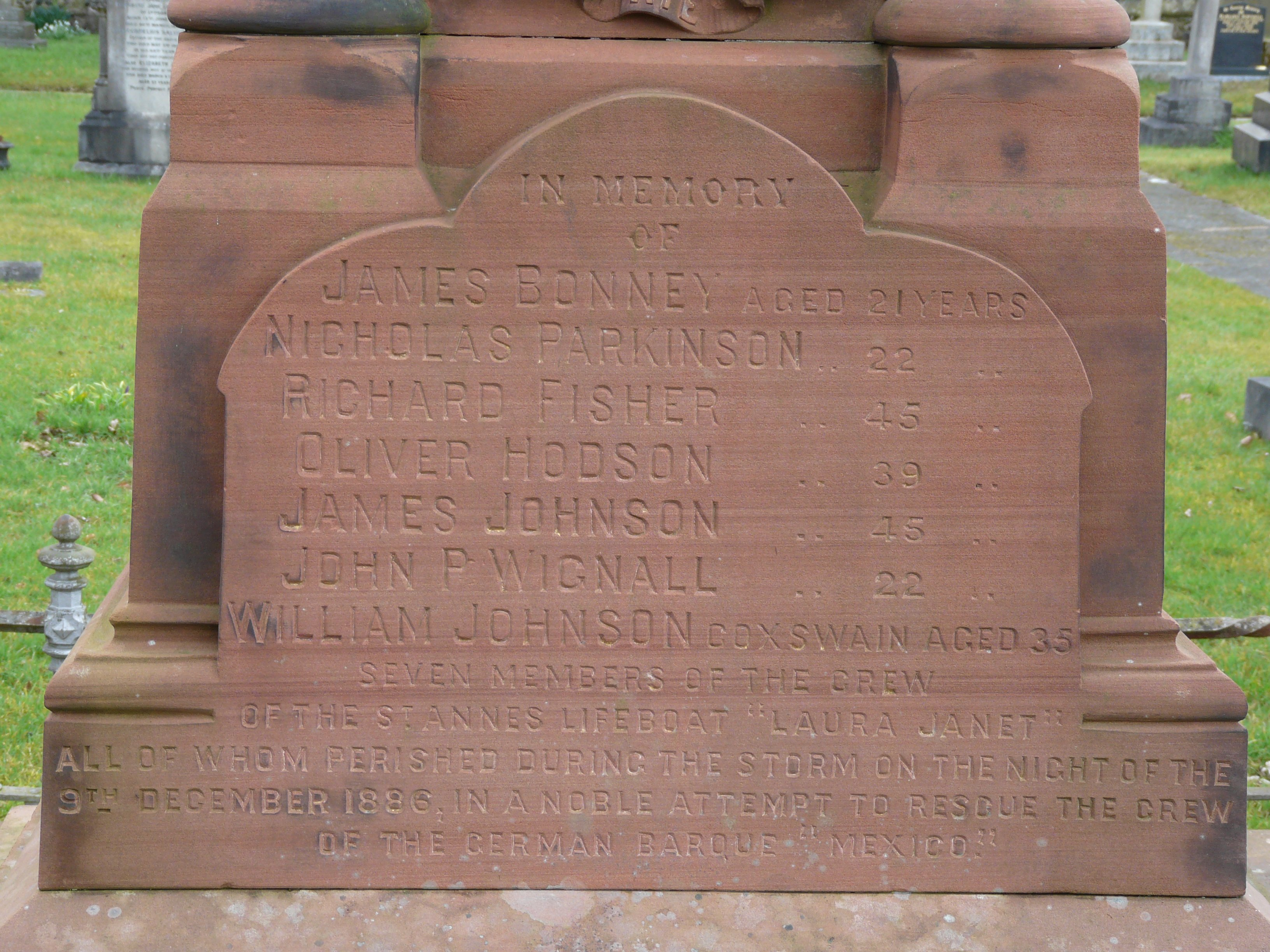
Ditto, east side detail

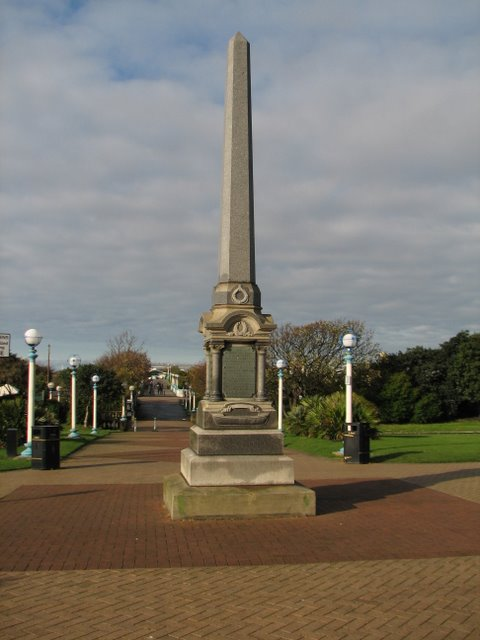
Southport Promenade

== Further history ==
The iron barque had been built in 1860 in Sunderland, England, as John Bull, and renamed Mexico in 1881. In March 1887, three months after the disaster, Mexico was sold for £45, and towed away for repair. She was then towed to Lytham, where she became a tourist attraction for two years. She resumed a working life, and in 1899 was renamed Valhalla. She was eventually lost in Scottish waters in February 1900.

== Exhibitions ==
There is a permanent exhibition to the disaster at The Atkinson gallery in Southport.

The Lytham Windmill Museum, at the defunct Lytham Lifeboat Station next to the windmill, hosts a "Great Lifeboat Disaster" exhibition.

== Television ==
The story of the wreck of the Mexico was featured in the BBC TV programme Coast, appearing in the fifth episode of the first series, first broadcast on 3 July 2005.

== See also ==
- Birkdale Palace Hotel – The Fishermen's Rest
- Ellen Southard
