= Whitelink Bay Lifeboat Station =

Former RNLI lifeboat station in Aberdeenshire, Scotland

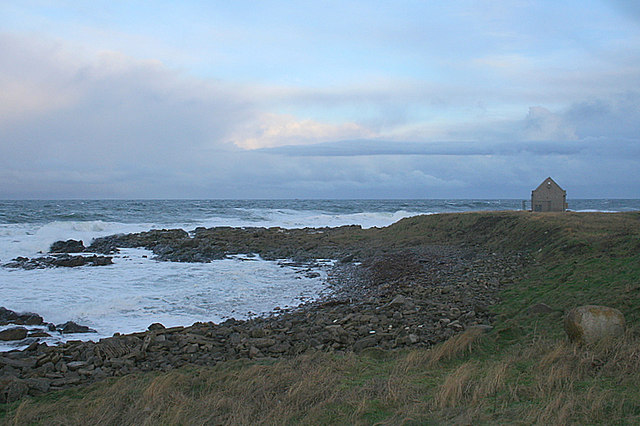
- Shore view at Inverallochy

- Whitelink Bay, Aberdeenshire

General information
- Status: Closed
- Location: Whitelink Bay, Inverallochy, Aberdeenshire, AB43 8YT, Scotland
- Coordinates: 57°40′11.8″N 1°55′17.1″W
- Opened: 5 March 1878
- Closed: 1905

Whitelink Bay Lifeboat Station was located at Whitelink Bay beach, which sits between the villages of Inverallochy and St Combs, approximately 5 miles (8.0 km) south-east of Fraserburgh, in the county of Aberdeenshire, on the east coast of Scotland.

A lifeboat was first placed at Whitelink Bay in 1878, by the Royal National Lifeboat Institution (RNLI).

Whitelink Bay Lifeboat Station was closed permanently in 1905.

== History ==
On the application by local residents, and following the visits and report by Rear-Admiral John R. Ward, Inspector of Lifeboats, at a meeting of the RNLI committee of management on Thursday 5 June 1877, it was decided to establish four new lifeboat stations in Scotland, at Nairn, Ackergill, Huna and Whitelink Bay. "..it was suggested that a Life-boat should be stationed in the neighbourhood of St. Comb's, a fishing village 5 miles S.E. of Fraserburgh, and the recommendation has been promptly acted on by the Institution. Numerous shipwrecks had occurred on that part of the coast, and appeared to be on the increase, while it was also thought that a Life-boat would probably often render good service to fishing boats overtaken by sudden gales of wind."

At a further meeting on 5 July 1877, tenders for the construction of Lifeboat Houses were accepted, totalling £2916. The Whitelink Bay boathouse, costing £284, was constructed on the sand links between St Combs and Inverallochy, on a site granted by Col. Fraser of Inverallochy, able to draw crew from the fishermen of both villages, and also Cairnbulg.

On 5 March 1878, a growing crowd of people escorted the new 33-foot self-righting 'Pulling and Sailing' (P&S) lifeboat, one with sails and (10) oars, from Rathen railway station to Inverallochy. Progressing onward, it was estimated that the crowd numbered 4000 by the time the lifeboat reached the new boathouse. After a short address, Capt. Sargeaunt, RN, Inspector of Lifeboats, handed the lifeboat to the care of the local branch. The cost of the lifeboat, £328-18s, was defrayed by a donation from Miss Adamson of Dundee, in memory of her brother, and the boat was duly named Robert Adamson by Mrs Gordon of Cairness.

In July 1888, the Institution received an anonymous donation of £2000, enough for the provision of three lifeboats. The benefactor chose not to give his name, but in accordance with his wishes, the three boat were named Ellen and Eliza (ON 245), placed at Cresswell, The Three Sisters (ON 199) at Courtown, and The Three Brothers (ON 241) was assigned to Whitelink Bay, replacing the Robert Adamson in 1889.

On 5 January 1899, the coxswain of The Three Brothers saw a fishing boat in distress off Rattray Head, after a sudden squall broke out, with a heavy shower of snow and sleet, in what had been a fine morning. The crew were summoned, and the Whitelink Bay lifeboat was launched at 12:00 noon. It was soon realised that three boats were in trouble. Reaching the first two boats within 30 minutes, Good Hope and Good Design, both of Fraserburgh, and each with three crew aboard, the boats were both taken in tow. The third boat failed to see the approaching lifeboat, and was run ashore at Rattray Head. Due to the poor conditions, it was decided to head for Peterhead, and with the later assistance of a Steam tug, the lifeboat and two fishing boats were towed the last 2.5 miles (4.0 km) to Peterhead. The lifeboat was then towed home.

Three Brothers was launched on 1 April 1902 into a strong north-west gale, following a message of an unnamed vessel, which had run ashore. The lifeboat arrived on scene just moments before the vessel was freed, and was not required, but the conditions were such due to the wind and tide, that it was impossible to return home, and the lifeboat was forced to head for Peterhead, only able to return to station two days later.

With lifeboats operating out of Peterhead, just 14 miles (23 km) to the south, and Fraserburgh just 5 miles (8.0 km) to the north, the decision was taken to close Whitelink Bay Lifeboat Station in 1905. The lifeboat on station at the time of closure, Three Brothers (ON 241) was transferred to Southport to be used primarily as a demonstration lifeboat. A memorial stands on the 18th hole of Inverallochy Golf Course, marking the site of the old boathouse.

== Whitelink Bay lifeboats ==
ON (Note: ON is the RNLI's Official Number of the boat.)	Name	Built	On Station	Class	Comments
Pre-629	Robert Adamson	1878	1878–1889	33-foot Peake Self-righting (P&S)	(Note: 33-foot x 8-foot 6in (10-oared) Peake-class self-righting (P&S) lifeboat, legacy of Miss Adamson of Dundee, built by Woolfe of Shadwell, London, costing £329.)
241	Three Brothers	1889	1889–1905	34-foot Self-righting (P&S)	(Note: 34-foot x 8-foot (10-oared) self-righting (P&S) lifeboat, and anonymous gift, built by D. and W. Henderson and Company of Partick, costing £441.)

Station Closed in 1905

Pre ON numbers are unofficial numbers used by the Lifeboat Enthusiast Society to reference early lifeboats not included on the official RNLI list.

== See also ==
- List of RNLI stations
- List of former RNLI stations
- Royal National Lifeboat Institution lifeboats
