= Courtown Lifeboat Station =

RNLI Lifeboat station in County Wexford, Ireland

- Flag of the RNLI

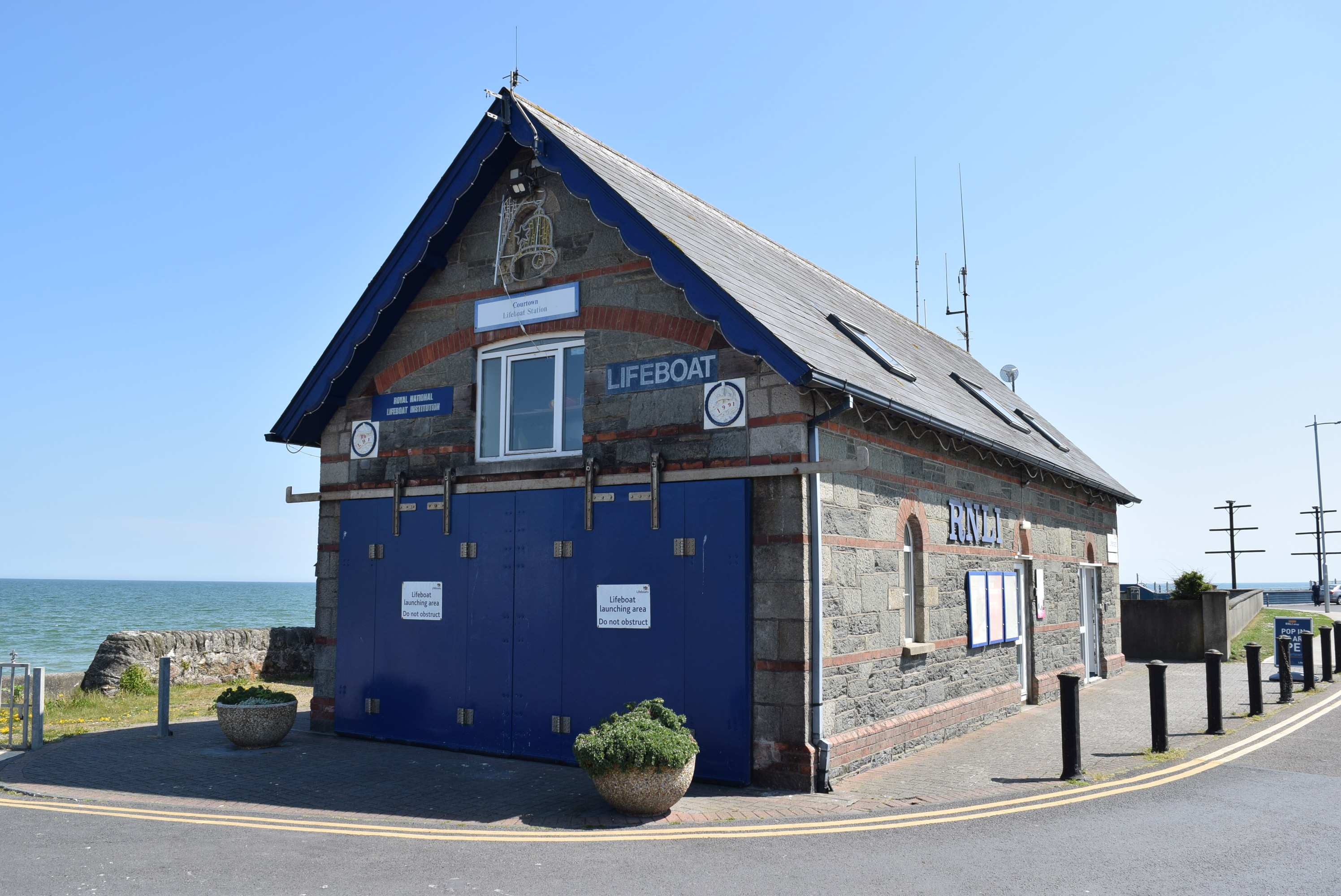
- Courtown Lifeboat Station in 2025

- Location within Ireland

General information
- Type: Lifeboat station
- Location: The Pier, Courtown, County Wexford, Ireland
- Coordinates: 52.6435°N 6.2258°W
- Opened: First lifeboat 1865; Current building 1911
- Owner: Royal National Lifeboat Institution

Website
- Courtown RNLI Lifeboat Station

Courtown Lifeboat Station can be found on The Pier at Courtown, a harbour village approximately 90 kilometres (56 mi) south of Dublin, on the east coast of County Wexford, in Ireland.

A lifeboat station was established at Courtown by the Royal National Lifeboat Institution (RNLI) in 1865. The station closed in 1925, but was re-opened as an Inshore lifeboat station in 1990.

The station currently operates a D-class (IB1) Inshore lifeboat, Frank (D-846), on station since 2020.

== History ==
At a meeting of the RNLI committee of management on Thursday 1 June 1865, following his visit to the village, Capt. John Ward, RN, Inspector of Lifeboats, recommended that a lifeboat be placed at Courtown, as requested by the local residents. A letter from Robert Whitworth of the Manchester branch of the Institution also indicated that they wished their fifth lifeboat to be placed at Courtown.

A new lifeboat station was established at Courtown in 1865. A boathouse was constructed, at a cost of £196, and a 36 ft (11 m) Peake-class self-righting (P&S) lifeboat, one with sails and (12) oars was transported to Courtown in December 1865, first via Holyhead and Kingstown, and then by rail, the final leg provided free of charge by the Dublin, Wexford and Wicklow Railway.

Although wrecks have not been frequent in the immediate locality of that place, yet it was considered by the residents that a life-boat stationed there might be of service in rescuing the crews of vessels getting on the Arklow and Blackwater sand-banks, there being plenty of boatmen to man such a boat.

— The Life-Boat, Vol. VI, Issue. 61, Page. 200, 2 July 1866

The lifeboat had previously served at North Sunderland, and had undergone work to extend it from 30 ft (9.1 m) in 1865. Originally funded by the Crewe Trustees, the further cost of the lifeboat had been provided by the Manchester branch of the RNLI, primarily through the efforts of Robert Whitworth and the Rev E. Hewlett, and the lifeboat was duly named Alfred and Ernest, after the two sons of Rev Hewlett.

Alfred and Ernest was found to be unfit for service in 1876. During her 11 years on station, she had been launched 14 times, and saved 59 lives. She was replaced by another 36 ft (11 m) lifeboat, funded by the Manchester branch, and again taking the name Alfred and Ernest. The new boat was transported to Kingstown, from where she was towed to her station by the Coastguard Steam-cruiser.

A slipway was built for the lifeboat in 1885, on the north side of the harbour. Two years later, it was extended by 21 ft (6.4 m).

The Institution was able to provide a new boat to Courtown in 1888. A gentleman, who declined to give his name, arranged to meet the Secretary of the Institution, and handed over the sum of £2000, to provide three lifeboats. He did however request that the lifeboats be named Ellen and Eliza (ON 245), the Three Brothers (ON 241), and the Three Sisters (ON 199). The lifeboats were placed at Cresswell, Whitelink Bay, and Courtown.

The boathouse was replaced by a new one in 1911, which cost £740, and which is once again in operation today. It has snecked blue limestone walls with red brick decorative bands and grey granite quoins, with three round-headed windows with red brick voussoirs let into the side walls. The roof is slated.

The first three Courtown lifeboats recorded 32 launches, with 91 lives saved. From 1909, the RNLI began to introduce motor-powered lifeboats, which were able to cover greater distances much faster than the earlier P&S lifeboats. These were gradually deployed on the east coast of Ireland, with one placed at Arklow in 1915, and Wexford in 1921. In view of this, and with the additional record of just five launches and no lives saved in the 22 years since 1903, at a meeting of the committee of management on Thursday, 21 May, 1925, it was decided to close the station at Courtown.

== World War II ==
In 1941, the Institution received a request from the Air Ministry, to place more lifeboat stations on the coast of Ireland. This was primarily to be available for the rescue of aircrew, forced down by combat, breakdown or bad weather during World War II. Due to the neutrality of the Republic of Ireland in WWII, Royal Air Force (RAF) rescue launches could not be stationed along the Irish coast, but as the independently operated RNLI was still active in Ireland, it was acceptable for them to create new stations.

Courtown was one of 13 auxiliary stations established on the Irish coast. With just one actual lifeboat available, the Queen Victoria (ON 719), a 51-foot Barnett-class lifeboat, which had been removed from St Peter Port for maintenance in 1940, and was allocated to Killybegs, the Institution equipped motor fishing boats, and paid a retaining fee to the respective Masters and crew. As with normal lifeboat men at the time, rewards were made for all launches to the aid of ships or aircraft in distress. Courtown Auxiliary lifeboat station was closed after the war.

== 1990 onwards ==
In the 1960s, the RNLI began to place small fast Inshore lifeboats around the coast. These were easily launched with just a few people, ideal to respond quickly to local emergencies.

On 15 May 1990, once again in response to a request from the local community, the RNLI decided to place a D-class (EA16) Inshore lifeboat (D-333) from the relief fleet at Courtown for evaluation. The following year, a D-class (EA16) lifeboat (D-412) was permanently assigned to the station. The original boat house was bought back by the RNLI for IR£45,000, and modified to house the ILB and launch equipment, along with a gift shop on the ground floor. An operations room and crew facilities were installed on the new first floor.

At a ceremony on 9 May 1992, the boathouse was officially reopened, and after a service of dedication by the Rev Joseph Jacobs and Rev Father Aidan Jones, the D-class (EA16) lifeboat, gift of BP Oil, was formally named BP Service (D-412).

The latest lifeboat to be stationed at Courtown arrived in 2022. The lifeboat was funded by Kathleen Watkin in memory of her late husband, a former employee of Ford Motor Company in both Essex and Southampton. The couple shared a passion in sailing, keeping a yacht in Chichester Harbour. At a ceremony on Saturday 28 May 2022, the new D-class (IB1) Inshore lifeboat was named Frank (D-846).

== Area of operation ==
The inshore lifeboat at Courtown has a range of 3 hours and top speed of 25 kn (46 km/h). Adjacent RNLI lifeboats are an All-weather Shannon-class lifeboat at Arklow to the north, and an Inshore lifeboat at Wexford to the south. There is also an independent inshore rescue service at Cahore.

== Station honours ==
The following are awards made at Courtown:

- RNLI Silver Medal
  Edward Waugh, Boatman, H.M. Coastguard, Wexford – 1858

== Courtown lifeboats ==
=== Pulling and Sailing (P&S) lifeboats ===
On station	ON (Note: ON is the RNLI's Official Number of the boat.)	Name	Built	Class	Comments
1865–1876	Pre-255	Alfred and Ernest	1852	36-foot Peake self-righting (P&S)	(Note: 30 ft 0 in (9.14 m) x 7 ft 4 in (2.24 m) (10-oared) Peake-class self-righting (P&S) lifeboat, built for the Crewe Trustees by Forrest of Limehouse, London, costing £150.); Previously unnamed at North Sunderland. Extended to 36 ft 0 in (10.97 m) (12-oared) in 1865, funded and named by the Manchester RNLI branch. Condemned in 1876.
1876–1888	Pre-610	Alfred and Ernest	1876	36-foot self-righting (P&S)	(Note: 36 ft 0 in (10.97 m) x 8 ft 4 in (2.54 m) (12-oared) self-righting (P&S) lifeboat, gift of the Manchester LB fund, built by Woolfe of Shadwell, London, costing £412.); Sold in 1888.
1888–1903	199	Three Sisters	1888	37-foot self-righting (P&S)	(Note: 37 ft 0 in (11.28 m) x 8 ft 0 in (2.44 m) (12-oared) self-righting (P&S) lifeboat, an anonymous gift, built by D. and W. Henderson and Company of Partick, costing £499.); Sold and broken up in 1903.
1903–1914	262	Robert Fitzstephens	1890	37-foot Self-righting (P&S)	(Note: 37 ft 0 in (11.28 m) x 8 ft 0 in (2.44 m) (12-oared) self-righting (P&S) lifeboat, gift of 'A Friend', built by Forrestt of Limehouse, costing £569. Renovated in 1903.); Previously at Carnsore, and at Burry Port (as David Barclay of Tottenham). Sold in 1917.
1917–1925	662	Ernest Dresden	1917	35-foot Rubie self-righting (P&S)	(Note: 35 ft 0 in (10.67 m) x 8 ft 10 in (2.69 m) (10-oared) Rubie-class self-righting (P&S) lifeboat, legacy of Mr E. Dresden of Cavendish Square, built by S. E. Saunders of Cowes, costing £1974.); Withdrawn from Port Isaac in 1933, now fully restored at Yonne (river), Migennes, France, December 2024.

Pre ON numbers are unofficial numbers used by the Lifeboat Enthusiasts' Society to reference early lifeboats not included on the official RNLI list.

=== Inshore lifeboats ===
==== D class ====
On station	Op.No. (Note: Op. No. is the RNLI's Operational Number of the boat carried on the hull.)	Name	Class	Comments
1990	D-333	Unnamed	D-class (EA16)	First deployed as a relief lifeboat in 1987.
1991–1999	D-412	BP Service	D-class (EA16)	
1999–2009	D-548	Star of the Sea	D-class (EA16)	
2009–2020	D-711	Cairde an Chuain	D-class (IB1)	
2020–	D-846	Frank	D-class (IB1)	

== See also ==
- List of RNLI stations
- List of former RNLI stations
- List of buildings in Ireland
- Royal National Lifeboat Institution lifeboats
