= Birkdale Palace Hotel =

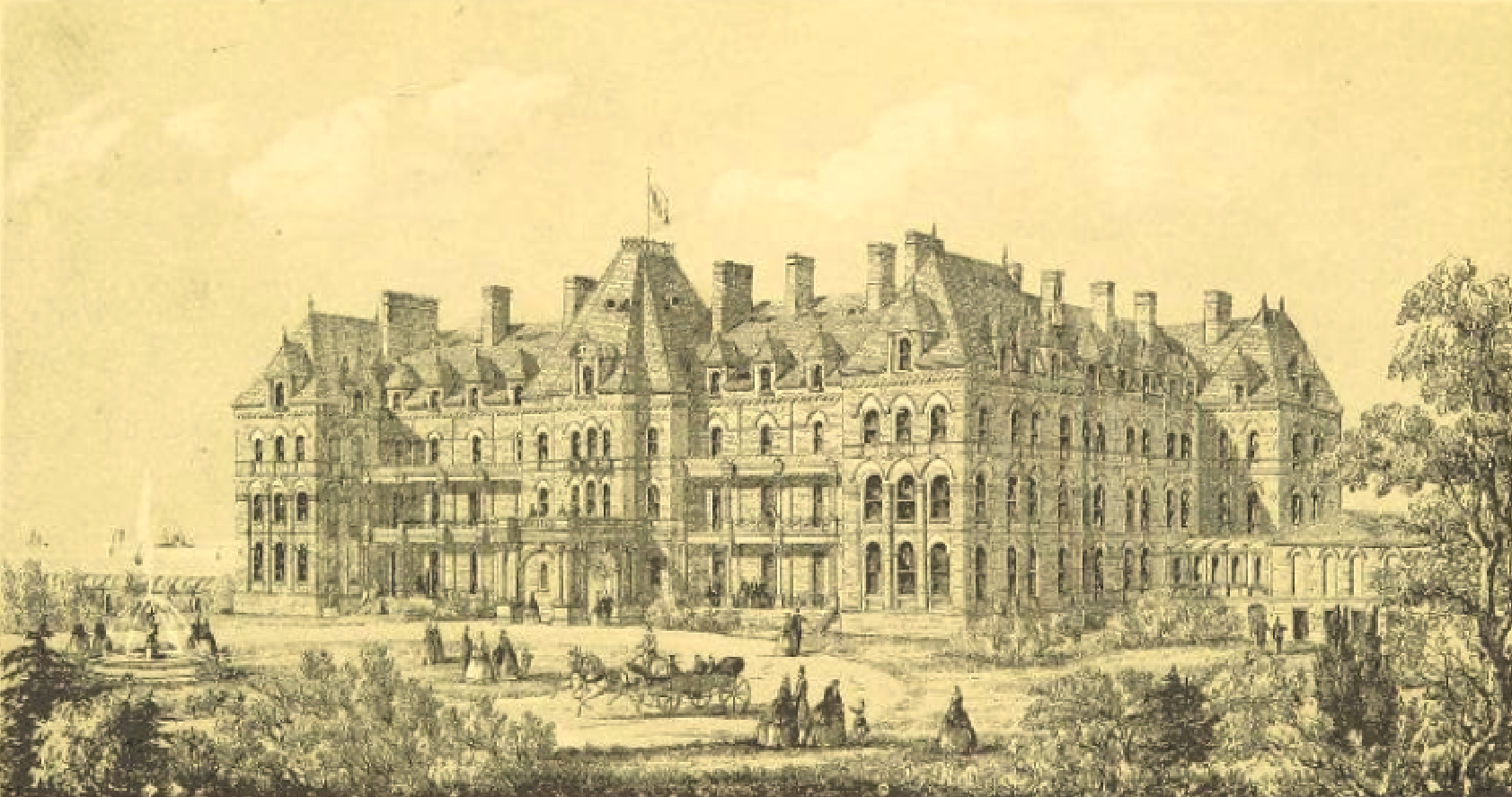
- The Palace Hotel in 1866. North-east view from Birkdale Park.

- Location within Southport

General information
- Type: Hydropathic spa and hotel
- Architectural style: Victorian
- Location: Southport, Oxford Road, Birkdale
- Coordinates: 53.637721°N 3.02565°W
- Completed: 1866
- Renovated: 1881
- Demolished: 1969
- Cost: £60,000

Dimensions
- Other dimensions: 200 ft (60 m) long

Technical details
- Structural system: Brick
- Floor count: 5

Design and construction
- Architect: William Mangnall

The Birkdale Palace Hotel was a luxury hotel located in the Lancashire coastal resort of Birkdale, Southport, on the north-west coast of England. The building towered over the surrounding area for over a hundred years before being demolished in 1969. During the Second World War it had been used as a rehabilitation centre for US airmen, and in the last two years of existence was used as a film location. The Palace is notorious in local folklore as a haunted hotel.

== 1866 ==
Leo H Grindon, author of Summer Rambles In Cheshire, Derbyshire, Lancashire and Yorkshire writes of his visit to the Palace Hotel:

"Over 700 species of our native plants are to be found there; nearly a hundred kinds of shells may be collected upon the sands, along with at least a score of Crustaceans and Annelids, and the fresh-water shells amount to at least thirty. Especially rich are the low wet sandy grounds that lie beyond Birkdale, and the plateaux that occur among the sand-hills beyond that noble edifice which, calling itself the 'Palace Hotel,' will some day be a first-class Sanatorium. It is of this building that, by the courtesy and liberality of the proprietors, a view is prefixed as frontispiece to the present volume. No other at Southport is so truly a seaside place, being quite away from town-disturbances, yet enjoying the advantages of a rail-way station close at hand. The look-out in all directions is very pleasing, that over the water particularly so; and from the gallery at the summit is obtained a panoramic view so vast and varied, that Southport need never be contemned again for its flatness."

Developed by the Southport Hotel Company (funded mainly by Manchester merchants), the Birkdale Palace Hotel was built on a 20-acre (8 ha) site at the end of Weld Road, fronting the Birkdale shore. The 75 bedroom, 200 ft (60 m) long hotel opened in 1866 at a cost of £60,000.

A long-standing rumour was that the hotel had been built the wrong way round, so instead of the hotel front facing out to sea, it in fact faced inland. It was also said that the architect, William Mangnall then committed suicide by jumping off the roof of the building. There have been stories of how the architect's ghost was heard to travel up and down in the lifts and was heard walking along the second floor stone floors whilst the building was being demolished. Unfortunately for lovers of ghost stories, recent research has revealed that there is no evidence that the hotel was built the wrong way round and William Mangnall actually died of consumption at Lord Street, Southport, two years after the hotel was opened.

In 1881 the hotel was completely refurbished and the grounds were reduced to 5 acres (2.0 ha), as the hotel had previously gone into liquidation, because it was not accessible by road or tram. The Southport & Cheshire Lines Extension Railway (SCLER) opened Birkdale Palace railway station adjacent to the hotel in 1884. A variety of baths were installed, a pipe built to draw in salt water from the sea and a lift installed to all floors. It re-opened with over 60 staff, as a hydropathic establishment to rival the very successful Smedley Hydro. Later, electric lighting was installed, produced by a steam driven generator. By 1910 the hotel was for sale due to financial difficulties.

The Birkdale Palace had extensive surrounding grounds providing facilities for Croquet, Bowling, Archery, Children's Playground, Walks, Bowers, Seats and Stables. Local residents could buy contracts to use the facilities.

A high embankment on the seafront kept the facilities sheltered from prevailing winds, the structure being topped with a 650 ft (200 m) promenade to overlook the shore.

== The twentieth century ==
In 1919 the hotel introduced flights from Blackpool to the nearby aviation ground. In an official guide to Southport in 1939, the hotel boasted of billiards, croquet on the lawns, dancing, evening concerts, Sunday afternoon orchestral teas and tennis, to name but a few activities available. It had 1,000 rooms and around 200 bedrooms and suites. By this time, the hotel had become a successful holiday resort hotel and conference centre, with stars like Frank Sinatra and Clark Gable staying there. In 1962, the Beatles performed there.

In 1942, it was taken over by the American Red Cross and used as an R&R (rest and recreation) home for bomber crews of the United States Army Air Force until 1945. During this period, it was one of the largest rehabilitation centres in the country for USAAF personnel, with more than 15,000 recuperated or as a break between their required "tours" of 20 bombing mission raids on German-occupied Europe.

A view of the Palace Hotel, Birkdale and the grounds

The hotel was still in use until the 1960s, when its final owners, Heddon Hotels, went into liquidation and were wound up in 1967. In February of that year there were only two guests – an elderly permanent resident and the company controller's wife.

Its last use was in 1968/9 as a film production base for Tigon, a specialist in low budget exploitation films run by legendary British producer Tony Tenser. What's Good for the Goose, starring Norman Wisdom, and The Haunted House of Horror (which was also filmed at the nearby Bank Hall in Bretherton) were both filmed at the hotel, with most of the indoor scenes in What's Good for the Goose making use of the hotel's public areas. Mr. Tenser actually suggested to Southport Council that they jointly buy the empty hotel and operate it as a film production centre but the Council turned down the idea, on the grounds that they did not enter into commercial partnerships.

The Hotel was demolished a few weeks later in 1969. There is now a housing estate called Ascot Close on the site, although what was originally the Coach House of the hotel survived demolition and is now the Fishermen's Rest pub.

== Paranormal activity ==
The story of the haunted lift at the Palace Hotel has entered into local folklore and was first reported in local newspaper The Southport Visiter on 6 May 1969, when a group of demolition workers reported that the lift at the old Palace Hotel in Birkdale was acting very strangely. Jos Smith, who was heading the demolition team, said: "Things began to happen soon after we started the job. First we were woken up by eerie voices and other strange noises in the middle of the night, then the lift suddenly began to work by itself."

Further investigation revealed that despite the fact that the lift's power had been cut and the brakes were on, the four ton box was quite merrily making its way between floors, just as it did before the hotel was closed. "That made the men really jittery!" added Mr Smith. A more prosaic explanation than supernatural intervention is that the lift had an auxiliary (or 'back up') power supply.

In fact, the team of hardened demolition workers became so jittery that they cut the giant lift from its holdings, but still the lift did not drop, the workmen hammered the top of the lift until this caused it to come crashing down from the third floor into the basement. The workmen also reported hearing voices, the sounds of arguments and a woman's stilettoes clattering through the foyer, although these may have been caused by courting couples who were often believed to make use of the hotel's empty bedrooms. The workers, from Rochdale, were even locked in their rooms on occasions.

In 1961 a six-year-old Southport girl, Amanda Jane Graham, was murdered after being abducted by a Birkdale Palace hotel porter. Her body was found under his bed at the hotel. It has been rumoured that two sisters carried out a suicide pact in the hotel and that 11 murders may have occurred within the hotels walls. Several persons have suggested that the temporary laying to rest of 14 deceased lifeboatmen in the hotel coach house, now the Fishermen's Rest pub, could provide another explanation for paranormal occurrences at the site.

== The Fishermen's Rest ==
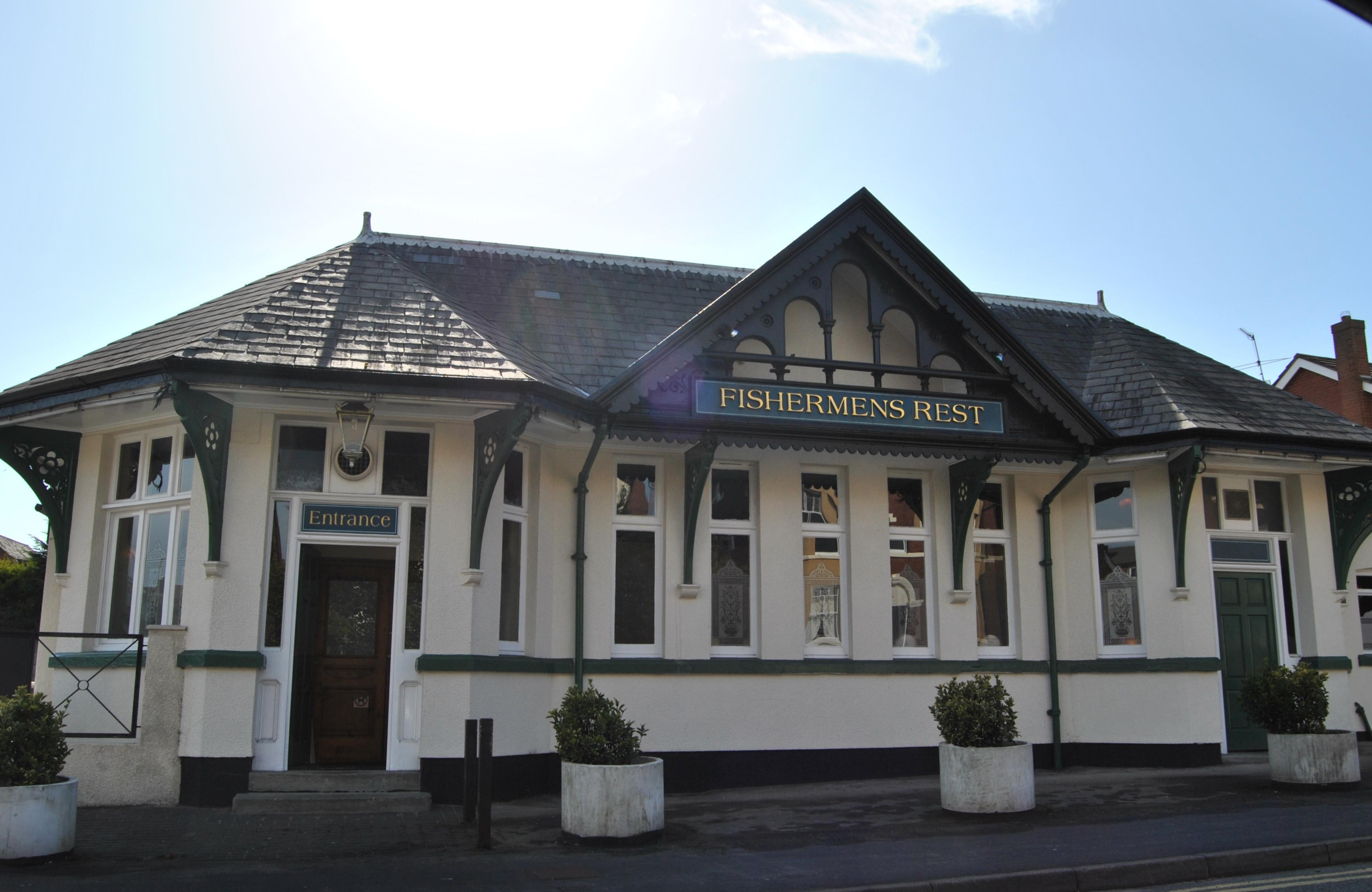
The Fishermen's Rest pub in April 2010.

The only surviving remnant of the Palace Hotel is now a pub called The Fishermen's Rest on Weld Road. It was originally the coach house of the hotel and was later converted to serve as a non-resident's bar to preserve the bars in the main building for the use of the hotel guests.

The building was used as a temporary mortuary for the bodies of 14 lifeboatmen drowned in the Southport and St Anne's lifeboats disaster on 9 December 1886, when the sailing ship Mexico was driven aground near Southport by a storm. The bodies were viewed there by the jury of the hastily convened coroner's inquiry held at the Palace Hotel.

The pub is named in tribute to the local fishermen who gave their lives serving as volunteer lifeboatmen, and they are remembered there every year on the anniversary of the event by the reading of a commemorative poem and the observation of a minute's silence.

== See also ==
- Southport and St Anne's lifeboats disaster
