= Cresswell Lifeboat Station =

Former lifeboat station in Northumberland, England

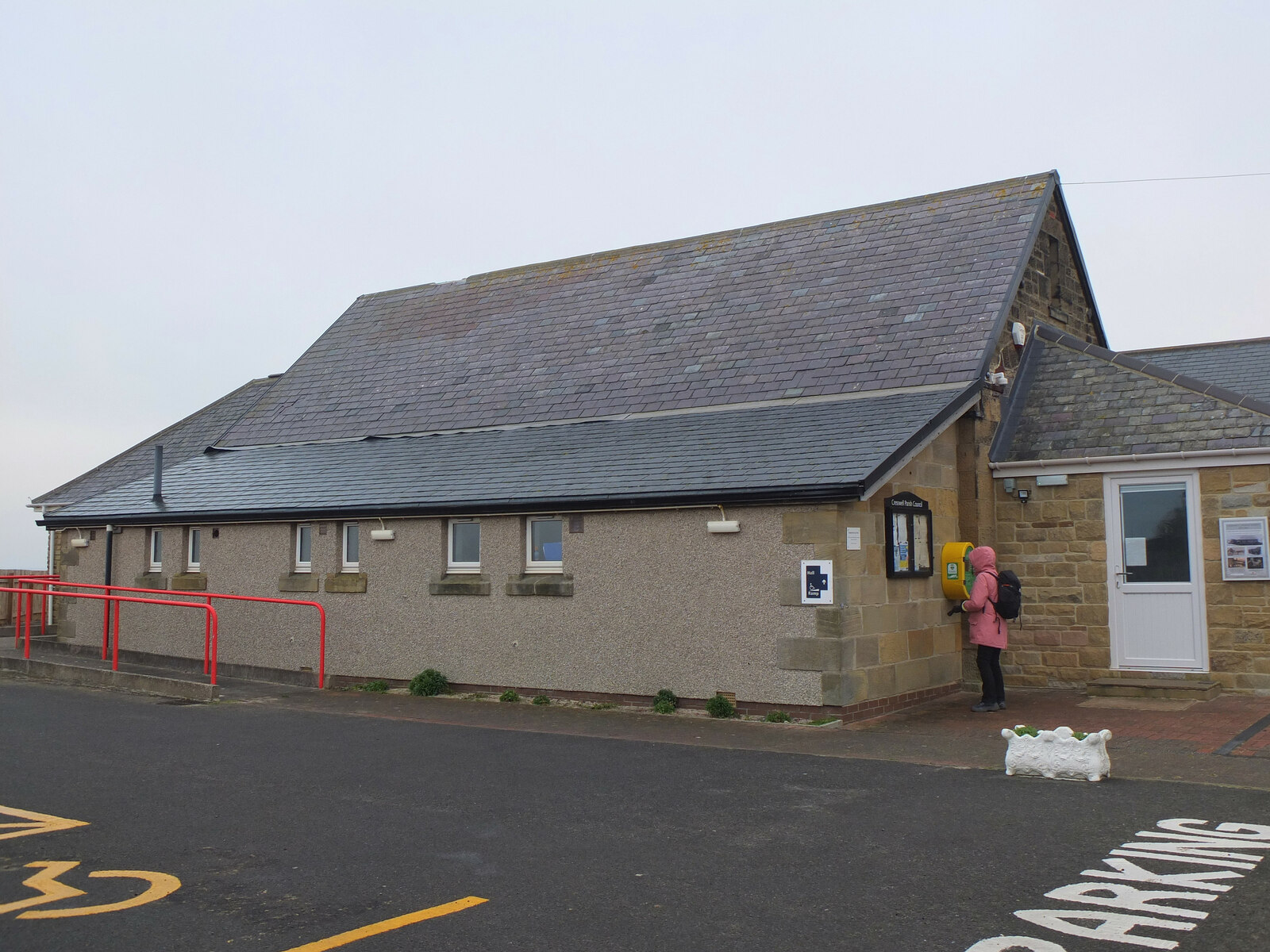
- Cresswell Old Lifeboat House, now Village Hall, 2022.

- Northumberland with Cresswell location

General information
- Status: Closed
- Type: RNLI Lifeboat Station
- Location: Cresswell, Northumberland, England
- Coordinates: 55°14′06.7″N 1°32′17.6″W
- Opened: 1875
- Closed: 1944

Cresswell Lifeboat Station was located at Cresswell, a village approximately 20 miles (32 km) north-west of Newcastle-upon-Tyne, in the county of Northumberland.

A lifeboat was first stationed at Cresswell by the Royal National Lifeboat Institution (RNLI) in 1875.

After operating for 69 years, Cresswell Lifeboat Station was closed in 1944.

== History ==
After the founding of the Royal National Institution for the Preservation of Life from Shipwreck (RNIPLS) in 1824, and later when it became the RNLI, it wasn't uncommon for any acts of gallantry at sea, whether by lifeboat, or other means, to be rewarded with RNIPLS or RNLI medals for gallantry. For the rescue of six men from the vessel Julius on 23 November 1861, which was aground and breaking up on Broad Sand Rocks, Thomas Brown (Big Tom), a Cresswell boatman, was awarded the RNLI Silver Medal.

Some years later, in 1874, James Brown and his three sons, all of Cresswell, were drowned, when their fishing coble overturned within sight of the shore. James was the brother of Thomas. At the inquiry, it was stated that no lifesaving equipment was available at Cresswell, nor was there a barometer to indicate a turn in the weather.

An appeal was made to the RNLI, for a lifeboat to be stationed at Cresswell. At a meeting of the RNLI committee of management on Thursday 7 May 1874, and following a visit and report by the RNLI Inspector of Lifeboats, it was decided to establish a lifeboat station at Cresswell.

A site for a boathouse, which cost £154-11s-4d, was granted by landowner Addison John Baker-Cresswell, of Cresswell Hall, former Member of Parliament for North Northumberland. Cresswell provided all the stone required for the construction, and his masons, free of charge.

A 30-foot self-righting 'Pulling and Sailing' (P&S) lifeboat, one with (8) oars and sails, was constructed by Forrestt of Limehouse, London, costing £328-18s-0d. A launching carriage cost a further £114-13s-0d. The whole cost of the station was the gift of Mr Thomas Hackwood of Sydenham. Thomas Brown (Big Tom) was appointed Coxswain.

At a ceremony on 21 August 1875, a service was held by the Rev. J. E. Leefe, after which the boat was handed over to the local committee, before being named Old Potter, in accordance with the donor's wishes. With the assistance of many of the wives of the lifeboat crew, the boat was then launched for demonstration.

The arrival of the lifeboat hadn't come a moment too soon. Just 4 months later, at 02:00 on the 5 January 1876, the steamship Gustaf of Gothenburg was wrecked in Druridge Bay. Initial efforts to launch the lifeboat failed, and with all local men occupied with the launch, Margaret Brown, along with her two sisters, was dispatched to alert the Newbiggin Rocket Brigade. However, a second attempt to launch the lifeboat was successful, and 11 men and three women were rescued.

In July 1888, the Institution received an anonymous donation of £2000, enough for the provision of three lifeboats. The benefactor chose not to give his name, but in accordance with his wishes, the three boats were named The Three Sisters (ON 199), placed at Courtown, The Three Brothers (ON 241) assigned to Whitelink Bay, and Ellen and Eliza (ON 245), which arrived on station at Cresswell on 24 August 1889.

The new lifeboat, Ellen and Eliza (ON 245) was a 34-foot Self-righting (P&S) 10-oared self-righting lifeboat, with two sails, and a water pump to remove water from the boat. Thomas Brown was still Coxswain, with no fewer than eight other crew members with the surname Brown. Thomas retired in 1890, being awarded a second RNLI Silver Medal, 29 years since his first award. His replacement was Henry Brown, who served just three years until 1893, handing over to Adam Brown, the son of Thomas.

Adam Brown would remain Coxswain until 1908. He had been a member of the crew since 1875. His retirement would come just before a new boat was to arrive in Cresswell, a 34-foot 10-oared Dungeness-class (Rubie) lifeboat, designed by Felix Rubie, costing £723, funded from the legacy of Mrs M.A.Vaughan of Highbury. The boat was named Martha (ON 599). Adam would be succeeded by William Brown, another crew member since 1875.

William would be awarded The Thanks of the Institution inscribed on Vellum, for a service in 1914, and continue as Coxswain until his retirement in 1925. Robert Brown would take over for a short time in 1925, and then hand over to Addison Brown, who would serve as Coxswain until 1944.

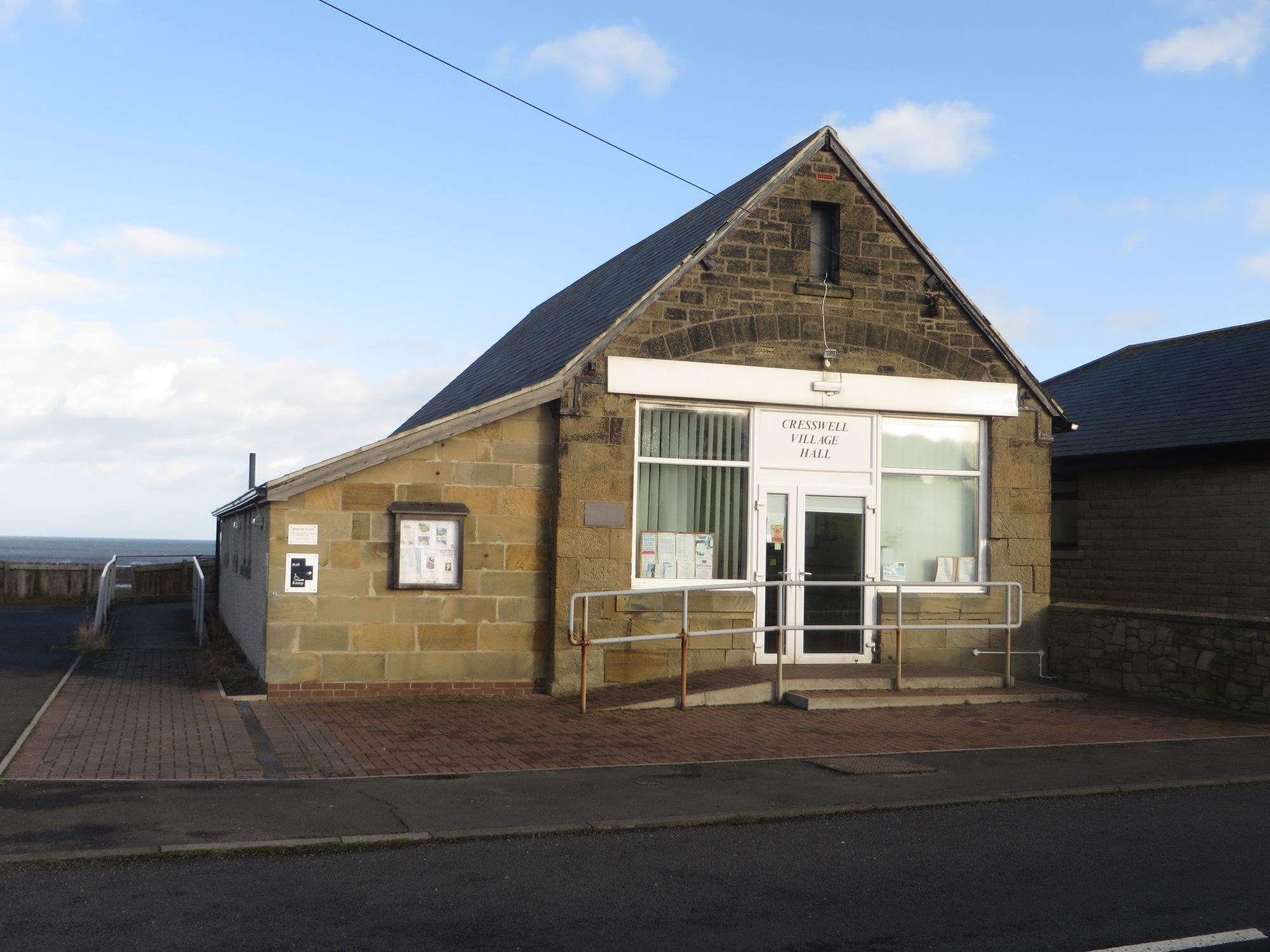
Cresswell Village Hall in 2018

With motor-powered lifeboats now at Amble to the north, and Newbiggin to the south, Cresswell Lifeboat Station was closed in 1944. The Cresswell lifeboats had launched 58 times, and saved 91 lives.

The lifeboat on station at the time of closure, Martha (ON 599), was sold out of service, being converted to be a motor yacht named Cresswell. She was last reported in the Arctic in the 1990s.

The boathouse is still in use, as the Cresswell Village Hall.

== Margaret Armstrong (née Brown) ==
No mention of the Cresswell lifeboat would be complete, without the mention of Margaret Armstrong (née Brown). Margaret was the daughter of James Brown, who had been lost in 1874, along with three of her brothers.

In 1876, in heavy rain and gale force conditions, she had already helped drag the lifeboat Old Potter 1 mile (1.6 km) north up the beach, for the lifeboat to launch to the aid of the steamship Gustaf. With all men from Cresswell involved in the launch, Margaret, along with two younger girls, was dispatched to summon the Newbiggin Rocket Brigade, running barefoot along the shortest route, a distance of 4 or 5 miles, through the swollen river Lyne, and in terrible conditions. Margaret was awarded a Silver teapot for her actions.

For over 50 years, she would always respond to the Maroon (rocket), to help launch the boat, and even at the age of 70, had never missed a quarterly practice or service launch.

She was featured in a film in 1921, named by the press as "The Second Grace Darling", and in 1922, Margaret was awarded the RNLI Gold Brooch, and the Institution's Record of Thanks. Margaret died in 1928 aged 79. A plaque in her memory was placed on the wall of St Bartholomew's Church, Cresswell by the RNLI in 1981.

== Station honours ==
The following are awards made at Cresswell.

- RNLI Silver Medal

Thomas Brown, Boatman – 1861

Thomas Brown, Coxswain – 1890 (Second-Service clasp)

- The Thanks of the Institution inscribed on Vellum

William Brown, Coxswain – 1914

- Silver Teapot

Margaret Brown – 1876

- Gold Brooch, and Thanks of the Institution

Margaret Armstrong (née Brown) – 1922

== Cresswell lifeboats ==
ON (Note: ON is the RNLI's Official Number of the boat.)	Name	Built	On station	Class	Comments
Pre-600	Old Potter	1875	1875−1889	30-foot Montrose Self-righting (P&S)	(Note: 30-foot x 8-foot (8-oared) Montrose-class self-righting (P&S) lifeboat, gift of Mr T. Hackwood of Sydenham, built by Forrestt of Limehouse, London, costing £230.)
245	Ellen and Eliza	1889	1889−1909	34-foot Self-righting (P&S)	(Note: 34-foot x 7-foot 6in (10-oared) self-righting (P&S) lifeboat, an anonymous gift, built by Watkins & Co. of Blackwall, London, costing £363.)
599	Martha	1909	1909−1944	34-foot Dungeness Self-righting (P&S)	(Note: 34-foot x 8-foot (10-oared) Dungeness-class (Rubie) self-righting (P&S) lifeboat, legacy of Mrs M. A. Vaughan of London, built by Thames Ironworks of Blackwall, London, costing £723.)

Pre ON numbers are unofficial numbers used by the Lifeboat Enthusiast Society, to reference early lifeboats not included on the official RNLI list.

== See also ==
- List of RNLI stations
- List of former RNLI stations
- Royal National Lifeboat Institution lifeboats
