= St Annes Lifeboat Station =

Former RNLI lifeboat station in Lancashire, England

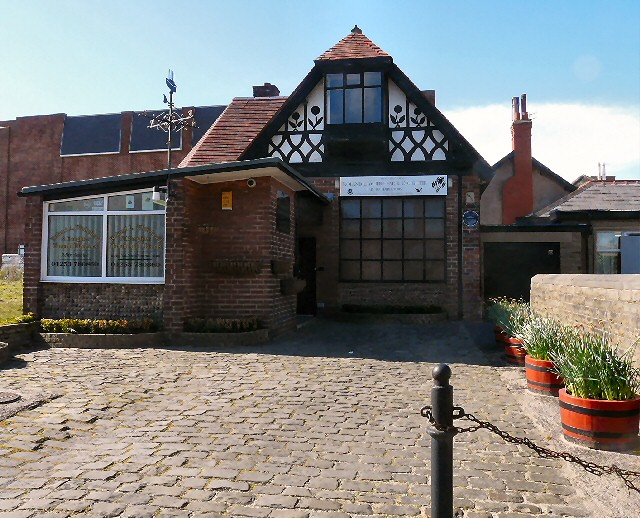
- St Annes Lifeboat House

- St Annes, Lancashire

General information
- Status: Closed
- Type: RNLI Lifeboat Station
- Location: Eastbank Road, St Annes, Lancashire, England
- Coordinates: 53°44′53.2″N 3°01′49.7″W
- Opened: 1881–1925

St Annes Lifeboat Station is a former lifeboat station, (by virtue of its merger), located on Eastbank Road, in the Fylde coast town of St Annes, Lancashire.

A lifeboat was first stationed at St Annes by the Royal National Lifeboat Institution (RNLI) in 1881.

In the 1920s, sand and silt build up in the area destroyed the local fishing industry, which had provided most of the lifeboat crew. St Annes was then deemed a 'half-time' station, only be able to launch around high-tide. It was decided to close the St Annes Lifeboat Station in May 1925.

In 1931, the remaining St Annes RNLI branch merged with the Lytham station, becoming Lytham St Annes Lifeboat Station, which continues to this day.

== History ==
St Annes as a town didn't exist before 1874. Starting in 1875, development of this Victorian seaside was rapid, and discussions of a lifeboat were soon on the agenda, hastened by the gift in 1879 of £1000 to start a lifeboat station, from Mr James Chadwick of Prestwich, Manchester. Admiral John Ward, Chief Inspector of Lifeboats visited St Annes in the May of that year, and a new station was subsequently agreed.

An order was placed with Woolfe of Shadwell for a 34-foot self-righting 'pulling and sailing' (P&S) lifeboat, one with 10 oars and sails, costing £363. The lifeboat and carriage were transported to St Annes free of charge by the London and North Western Railway, arriving on 21 September 1881, At a ceremony the following Saturday, Mrs Chadwick named the new lifeboat Laura Janet.

A new boathouse was constructed on Eastbank road by Moore Brothers of Rawtenstall, for £368, along with a launchway at the end of the road.

It would not be until 4 December 1886 that Laura Janet would record her first lives saved, six men from the vessel Yan Yean of Montrose.

Only five days later, at 21:00 on the 9 December 1886, distress signals were seen from the German barque Mexico, driven ashore off Ainsdale. Much has been documented about the Mexico disaster. 13 crewmen aboard the Laura Janet launched into the darkness, never to return. 14 of the 16 crew of the Southport lifeboat were also lost, the greatest ever disaster for the RNLI.

The upturned Laura Janet was recovered from Birkdale beach, and officially placed back on service until January 1887, although she was never used again, and eventually returned to London, before being broken up.

A new 34-foot self-righting lifeboat, Nora Royds (ON 194), arrived at St Annes on 5 January 1887, funded by Colonel Sir Clement Molyneux Royds CB TD DL FSA, later to become Member of Parliament (MP) for Rochdale. From the outset, the boat was disliked by the crew, so much, that most resigned. Even a new crew, led by Thomas Rimmer of Lytham, disliked the boat, and a second larger boat was requested. The Lytham lifeboat was brought to St Annes for comparison, and found to be far superior, the RNLI then agreeing to a No.2 boat for St Annes.

The new boat, to be moored afloat off the end of St Annes Pier, was a 39-foot self-righting boat constructed by Woolfe, costing £588. She arrived in St Annes on 12 May 1888, but whilst awaiting delivery, the Nora Royds was called to the aid of the Albert Williams on 26 January 1888, along with the Lytham lifeboat. During this rescue, the St Annes boat managed to get in the way of the Lytham boat while it was veering down, and the two boats collided, causing considerable damage to the Lytham Lifeboat. Despite this, 10 crew were rescued, and Coxswain Thomas Rimmer was awarded the RNLI Silver Medal

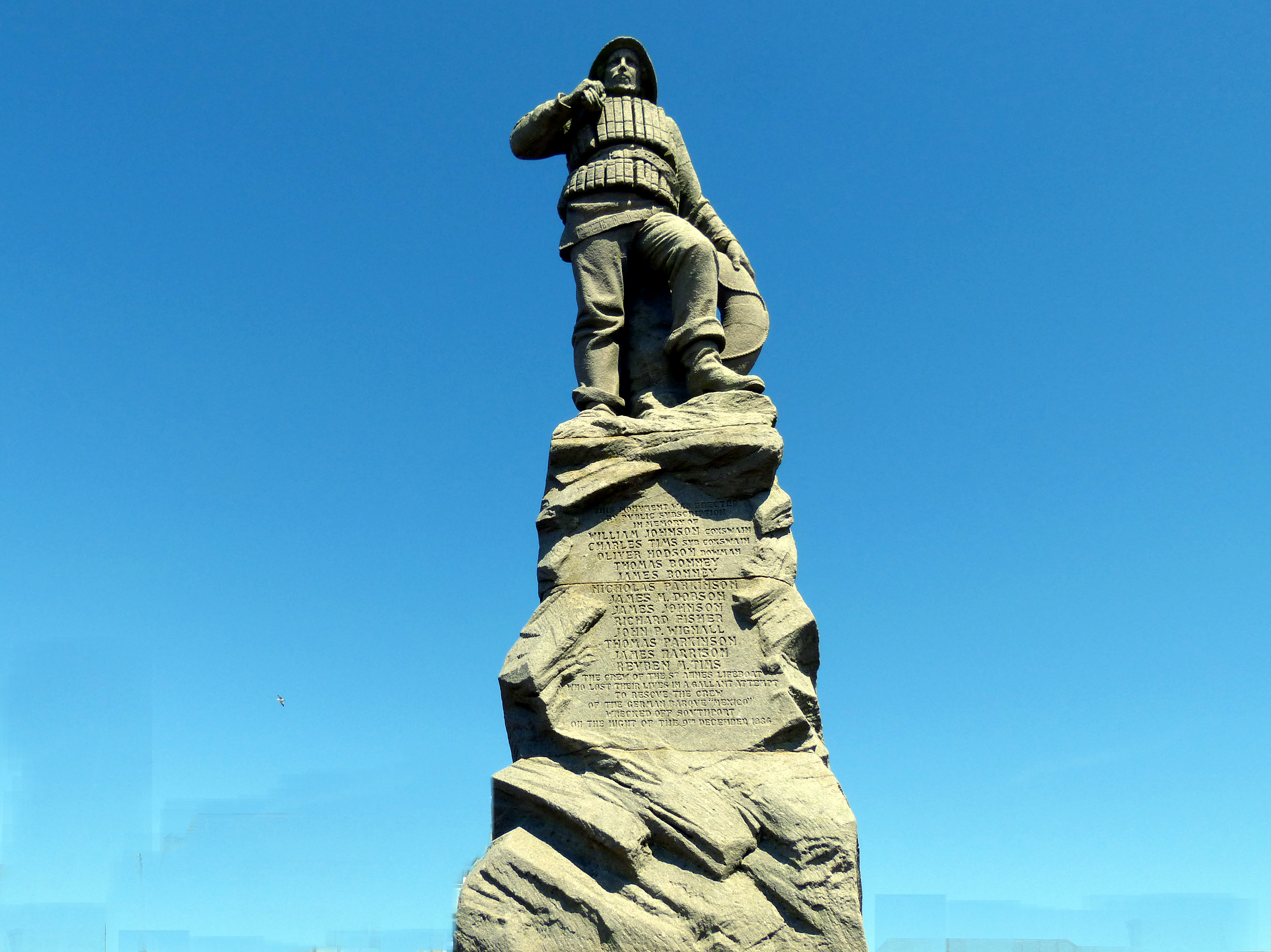
St Annes Lifeboat Monument

On 23 March 1888, a large monument, topped by a figure of a lifeboatman, and designed by William Birnie Rhind was unveiled by John Talbot Clifton on St Annes Promenade, in memory of those lost in the Mexico Disaster. Then followed the naming ceremony of the new lifeboat, The Brothers (ON 190), and Coxswain Thomas Rimmer was presented with his silver medal. Ending the ceremony was a demonstration of the four lifeboats from Lytham, Southport and St Annes.

It had been realised that a broad-beam more stable boat was better suited to the shallow waters around the Fylde, with a self-righting boat being impractical. In 1892, The Brothers was replaced by a 43-foot non-self-righting boat, named Brothers (ON 315). Constructed by D. and W. Henderson and Company of Partick, and designed specifically by RNLI Naval Architect George Lennox Watson, it was initially known as the 'Modified Southport Type', but later became better known as a Watson-class lifeboat.

In 1895, a store was built on the pier for lifeboat kit, lifejackets etc., to save the crew having to first attend the main boathouse.

Operations didn't run smoothly at St Annes in the late 1800s and into the 1900s. A swing gangway constructed on the Pier in 1895 to access the boarding boat was soon deemed too dangerous, and was removed in 1898. Brothers (ON 315) was sent away for modifications. The first boarding boat, one of three former lifeboats stationed at St Annes, was found to be defective in 1898. It's replacement capsized in 1903, and the third one, the Edward and Lucille (ON 344), was wrecked against the side of the Pier in 1907. But more importantly, shifting sand and silt around the Pier meant that depending on the tide, the Brothers was hard aground, and unable to be used. Administrative difficulties were also encountered, when Honorary Secretary Thomas Bradley was required to write to the Town Council, and then reply to himself by letter, as he was also the Town Clerk.

Nora Royds (ON 194), having served 21 years, with the last year being used as the boarding boat, and with a record of five launches and 10 lives rescued, was condemned in 1908, and replaced by a 36-foot Liverpool-class lifeboat, the James Scarlett (ON 587). Provided from the bequest of Mr James Scarlett of Bowden, Cheshire, the station finally had the boat they needed, a wide beam boat, which was stored in the boathouse, easily transported on its new carriage with 'tipping plate' wheels (folding metal plates for easier travel over sand).

The No.2 station was closed in 1910, with the Brothers being transferred to Cromarty. James Scarlett (ON 587) would serve for 17 years, launching nine times and saving 20 lives. In the end, the sand and silt build up would beat the station, which had already decimated the local fishing industry, the source of many of the crew. Even with the arrival of a new launch tractor in 1922, Clayton T1, the station was designated a 'half-time' station, only being able to launch certain hours before and after high-tide. This was deemed unacceptable by the RNLI, and the station closed in May 1925.

The James Scarlett (ON 587) was retired from service, and placed on display in the boathouse for three years, being used for demonstration purposes, until being sold in 1928. She was transported by wagon to Lytham, and then travelled to the East Coast by the canal network. She was last reported as the Nymphea in King's Lynn in 1969.

The boathouse was sold to the Drive Methodist Church in St Annes, who still own the building on Eastbank Road. It has been used as an ambulance station, a store, and since 1994, a funeral parlour.

The St Annes RNLI branch continued to operate for fundraising, and was merged with Lytham on 12 March 1931, creating Lytham St Annes Lifeboat Station, which still operates today.

For more information, please see

- Lytham Lifeboat Station 1851–1931
- Lytham St Annes Lifeboat Station 1931–Present

== Sir Charles Wright Macara ==
If anything good was to come out of the Mexico Disaster, it was Lifeboat Saturday. Charles Wright Macara was voted as a new member of the St Annes RNLI Branch Committee in 1887, becoming chairman in January 1889. A relief fund had been set up for the dependents of those lost in the Mexico Disaster, and a sum of over £30,000 had been donated within a matter of weeks. Macara realised that the majority of lifeboat donations were coming from just a few wealthy patrons.

With the backing of friends in Manchester, and approval from Manchester and Salford Councils, he organised the first Lifeboat Saturday, which took place in Manchester on 17 October 1891. A grand parade, including the Mary Anna lifeboat from Southport, and the Nora Royds from St Annes, made its way through the city to Belle Vue Gardens. Over £5,500 was raised on the day. Many other towns followed, and would have their own Lifeboat Saturday. This would redefine fundraising methods for the RNLI, leading to other street collections and flag days.

== Station honours ==
The following are awards made at St Annes

- Silver Medal, awarded by the Societe des Sauveteurs, Medailles du Gouvernement de la Gironde
  St Annes Lifeboat Station – 1886
- RNLI Silver Medal
  Thomas Rimmer, Coxswain – 1888

== Roll of honour ==
In memory of those lost whilst serving St Annes lifeboat.

- On service to the Mexico, 9 December 1886

William Johnson, Coxswain (35)
Charles Tims, Second Coxswain (43)
Oliver Hodson, Bowman (39)
James Bonney (21)
Thomas Bonney (35)
James Dobson (23)
Richard Fisher (45)

James Harrison (19)
James Johnson (45)
Nicholas Parkinson (22)
Thomas Parkinson (28)
Reuben Tims (30)
John P. Wignall (22)

== St Annes lifeboats ==
=== No.1 Station ===
| ON (Note: ON is the RNLI's Official Number of the boat.) | Name | Built | On station | Class | Comments |
|---|---|---|---|---|---|
| Pre-652 | Laura Janet | 1880 | 1881−1887 | 34-foot Self-righting (P&S) | (Note: 34-foot x 8-foot 3in (10-oared) self-righting (P&S) lifeboat, gift of Mr J. Chadwick of Prestwich, built by Woolfe of Shadwell, London, costing £363.); Capsized 1886, with the loss of all 13 crew. |
| 194 | Nora Royds | 1886 | 1887−1908 | 34-foot Self-righting (P&S) | (Note: 34-foot x 7-foot 6in (10-oared) self-righting (P&S) lifeboat, gift of Col. Sir Clement Royds of Rochdale, built by Woolfe of Shadwell, London, costing £297.) |
| 587 | James Scarlett | 1908 | 1908−1925 | 36-foot Liverpool (P&S) | (Note: 36-foot x 9-foot (12-oared) Liverpool-class non-self-righting (P&S) lifeboat, legacy of Mr J. Scarlett of Bowden, built by Thames Ironworks of Blackwall, London, costing £1,026.) |

Pre ON numbers are unofficial numbers used by the Lifeboat Enthusiasts' Society to reference early lifeboats not included on the official RNLI list.

=== No.2 Station ===
| ON | Name | Built | On station | Class | Comments |
|---|---|---|---|---|---|
| 190 | The Brothers | 1888 | 1888−1892 | 39-foot Self-righting (P&S) | (Note: 39-foot x 9-foot (12-oared) self-righting (P&S) lifeboat, an anonymous gift, built by Woolfe of Shadwell, London, costing £588.) |
| 315 | Brothers | 1892 | 1892−1910 | 43-foot Watson (P&S) | (Note: 43-foot Watson x 11-foot 9in (8-oared) non-self-righting (P&S) lifeboat, an anonymous gift, built by D. and W. Henderson and Company of Partick, costing £1,565.) |

=== No.2 Station boarding boats ===
| ON | Name | Built | On station | Class | Comments |
|---|---|---|---|---|---|
| Pre-642 | Daniel Proctor | 1879 | 1889−1898 | 32-foot Self-righting (P&S) | (Note: 32-foot self-righting (P&S) lifeboat, built by Woolfe of Shadwell, London, costing £282 when new.); Previously City of Manchester at Ferryside and the John and Betty Cuttell at Bamburgh Castle |
| 148 | Mary Adelaide Harrison | 1888 | 1898−1902 | 34-foot Self-righting (P&S) | (Note: 34-foot self-righting (P&S) lifeboat, gift of Mrs H. Harrison of Liverpool, built by D. and W. Henderson and Company of Partick, costing £396 when new.); Previously at Campbeltown. |
| 344 | Edward and Lucille | 1892 | 1902−1907 | 34-foot Self-righting (P&S) | (Note: 34-foot x 8-foot (10-oared) self-righting (P&S) lifeboat, legacy of Mrs L. Collinson of London, built by Chambers and Colby of Lowestoft, costing £386.); Previously at Rye Harbour and Scarborough |

=== Launch and recovery tractors ===
| Op. No. (Note: Op. No. is the RNLI's Operational Number carried on the hull or vehicle.) | Reg. No. | Type | On station | Comments |
|---|---|---|---|---|
| T1 | TC 648 | Clayton | 1922–1925 | |

== See also ==
- List of RNLI stations
- List of former RNLI stations
- Royal National Lifeboat Institution lifeboats
