= Lytham St Annes Town Hall =

Municipal building in Lytham St Annes, Lancashire, England

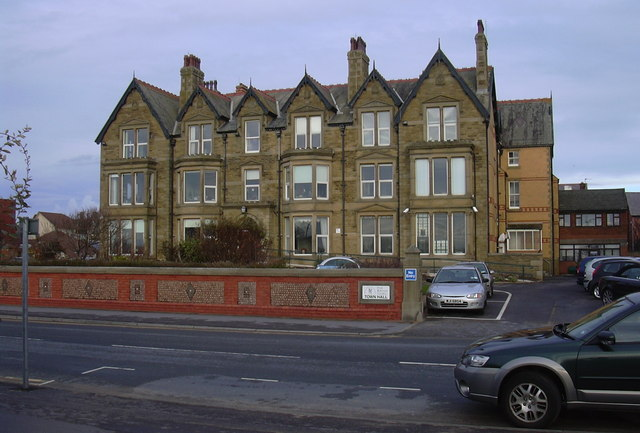
- Lytham St Annes Town Hall

- Location in Lytham St Annes Location in the Borough of Fylde Location in Lancashire
- 53.7498°N 3.0339°W
- Location: South Promenade, Lytham St Annes

History
- Built: 1898

Site notes
- Architectural style: Victorian style

Lytham St Annes Town Hall is a municipal building on the South Promenade in Lytham St Annes, Lancashire, England. The structure, which is used as the headquarters of Fylde Borough Council, is a locally listed building.

== History ==
The building was originally commissioned by William John Porritt through his development business, the St Anne's on the Sea Land and Building Company, for use as the "Southdown Hydro Hotel": it has been described by the Lytham St Annes Civic Society as "one of the best examples of a Porritt development". It was designed in the Victorian style, built in stone quarried in East Lancashire and was completed in 1898. The design involved a main frontage with six bays facing onto the South Promenade; the third bay from the left featured a porch with a round headed entrance flanked by pairs of colonettes supporting a moulded architrave. The building was fenestrated, on the lower two floors of the outer bays, by square headed bay windows, on the lower two floors of the second and fourth bays, by canted bay windows and, on the second floor, by two-light pedimented sash windows. The bays were all gabled, with the outer bays featuring large gables than the inner bays. The interior decoration included Minton tiles on the walls and fine stained glass windows. The proprietor, a Mrs Spyree, claimed that the building enjoyed "the best situation facing pier and sea."

In 1922, St Anne's-on-the-Sea Urban District Council merged with Lytham Urban District Council to form Lytham St Annes Metropolitan Borough. Lytham Urban District Council did not have a permanent headquarters at that time and St Anne's Public Offices were not large enough to accommodate the enlarged authority, so the new civic leaders decided to acquire the Southdown Hydro Hotel which was conveniently located just to the rear of the old public offices. The former hotel was converted and brought into use as "a modern and well-equipped town hall" in 1925. Internally, the principal new room created was the council chamber.

In June 1925, John Booth of the local grocery business, Booths, donated a painting by the artist, Richard Ansdell, depicting a young girl with a sheepdog and a herd of sheep. It was given to the council on condition that it be hung in the council chamber. This painting entitled "the Herd Lassie" was the start of the Lytham St Annes Art Collection which was assembled following further donations by other members of the Booth family, by the former mayor, Alderman James Herbert Dawson, and by other benefactors. The building went on to become the local seat of government for the enlarged Fylde District Council in 1974.
