= Lytham Pier =

Pier in Lytham, Lancashire, England

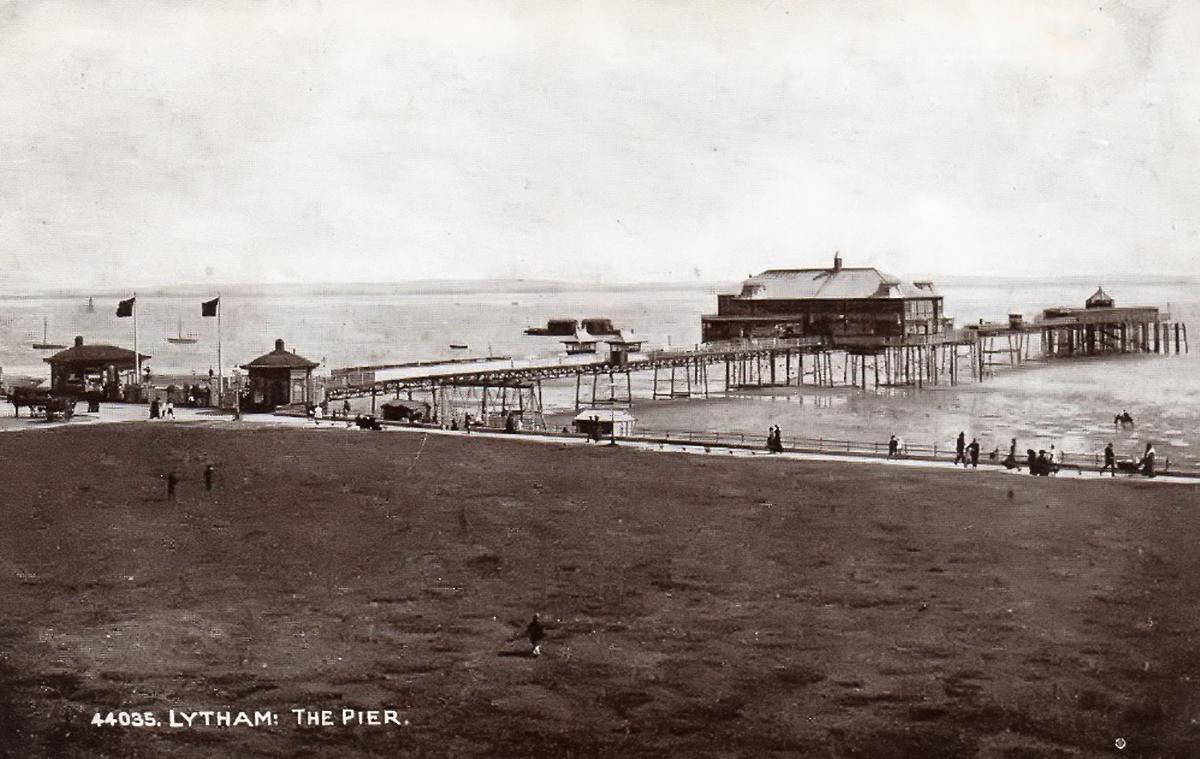
- Lytham Pier, c. 1920
- Type: Pleasure
- Carries: Pedestrians
- Location: Lytham
- Coordinates: 53.7337°N 2.9626°W

Characteristics
- Total length: 914 feet (279 m)

History
- Designer: Eugenius Birch
- Constructor: Robert Laidlaw
- Opening date: 17 April 1865; 161 years ago
- Closure date: 4 March 1960; 66 years ago
- Map showing the former location of Lytham Pier Lytham Pier (the Fylde)

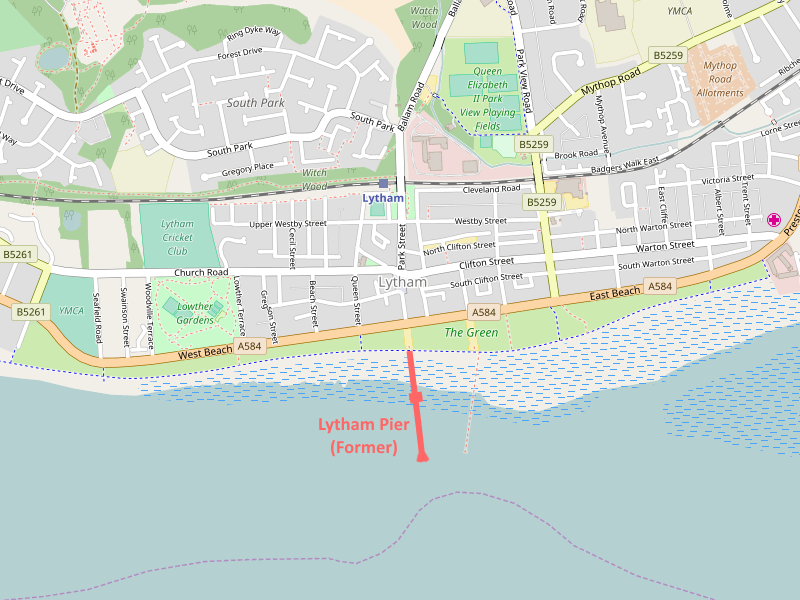
- Map showing the former location of Lytham Pier

Lytham Pier, a pleasure and working pier, was opened in the seaside town of Lytham, Lancashire, England in 1865, in the face of reservations from local residents. The pier underwent several renovations during the 1890s and early 1900s before being badly damaged by a storm in 1903, during which two barges collided with the structure and split it in two. A fire in 1928 resulted in extensive damage to the pavilion, which was not rebuilt, although the pier itself was reopened several months later. Following a period of decline it was closed to the public shortly before the outbreak of the Second World War. The pier was demolished in 1960 despite the protests of thousands of local residents.

Plans to rebuild the pier were discussed by local councillors in 2007, with the Lytham St Annes Civic Society opposed to any such plan and no further progress has been made since that initial proposal.

== History ==
=== Planning ===
Provision for a pier to be constructed for pleasure and as a boat-landing deck was first discussed during the early 1860s, leading to the formation of the Lytham Pier Company in 1861. Plans included visitor waiting rooms at the pier head and ornamental gates at the entrance, similar to those at Brighton's West Pier. Authorised by the Lytham Pier Order 1864, construction began in 1864 with the screwing in of the first iron pile, a pre-planned event designed to ensure a suitably large number of visitors would be present to witness the occasion. The pier did not have unanimous local support; some residents believed that Lytham had insufficient regular visitors to make a pier financially viable, or that a high tide would too easily destroy the pier.

=== Construction ===
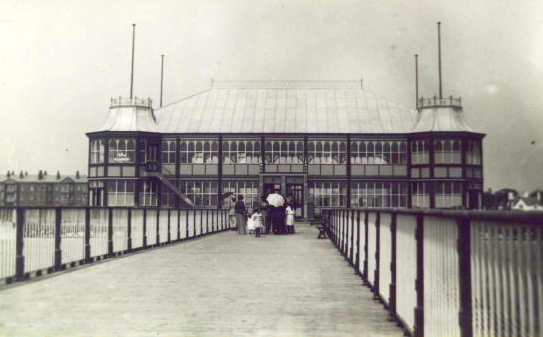
Lytham Pier Pavilion, opened in 1892

Despite some reservations, building work was completed a year after the first pile had been screwed in, at a cost of £5760 (equivalent to £711,700 in 2024), raised from 1,200 shares of £5 each. (Note: United Kingdom Gross Domestic Product deflator figures follow the MeasuringWorth "consistent series" supplied in Thomas, Ryland; Williamson, Samuel H. (2026). "What Was the U.K. GDP Then?". MeasuringWorth.)

three hundred long tons (305 t) of iron were used in the construction of the pier. It was supported by 126 iron columns, 54 feet (16 m) apart and screwed into the solid clay base beneath the beach. A shelter was erected on the pier head's dock for passengers embarking or landing from steam vessels. The pier was capable of accommodating up to 5000 people, of whom 1000 could be seated.

=== Opening ===
The pier was opened by Lady Eleanor Clifton on Easter Monday, 17 April 1865. Clifton, of Lytham Hall, was invited to the opening by the pier's directors and she accepted their invitation "at much personal inconvenience." Also invited were the Mayor of Preston and railway officials connected with Lytham. When visitors arrived for the opening, bands of music were playing, flags were flying and riflemen were being drilled to perform a guard of honour. The pier was "bedecked with scores of flags and looked as gay as hands could make it." Immediately following the opening ceremony, there was a rush of visitors anxious to go on the pier, which accepted admissions until around 5pm. Admission was one penny and despite heavy thunder towards the end of the day, the receipts still totalled £20 1s 7d from 4,817 total visitors, in addition to several season ticket payments.

=== Operation ===
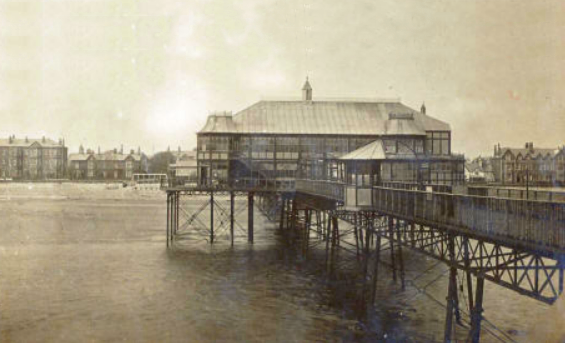
Extension to Lytham Pier in 1901

The pier had a small renovation in 1892 when a floral hall pavilion was added half-way along the deck, at a cost of £12,000 (equivalent to £1.67 million in 2024). A further reconstruction followed in 1901–1902 to enlarge the pavilion, including raising the roof to accommodate taller stage scenery and enlargement of the theatre stage; other improvements included the erection of an additional dressing room, refreshment rooms and an upper tea-room added to the pavilion's balcony.

The pier suffered significant damage from two separate incidents in 1903. The first occurred on 27 February, when two shelters were blown into the sea during a storm. Worse damage was caused later in the year on 6 October, when two barges driven by a gale-force wind collided with the pier despite the best efforts of the one-man crews on each boat; one caused significant damage to the central pier structure while the other got caught among the piers supporting the pavilion. Claims for compensation were made against Preston Corporation, who owned the barges, and after repairs had been undertaken the pier reopened at Easter 1904.

During the early 1900s, George Kingston's Minstrels became an attraction on the pier and the beach, continuing through to 1910 on the pier and in the pavilion. Divers performed each season at the pier head in swimming displays, featuring Professor Stearne and Professor Payne. A Floral Hall opened in July 1911, occasionally playing host to orchestral concerts, as well as amateur dramatic societies. By the 1920s, the pavilion was showing films and this was its primary fare income from visitors.

=== Decline ===
By 1920 the pier was struggling to remain financially viable; JH Harrison, the manager of 32 years, stepped down the following year. The pavilion was destroyed by fire on 29 January 1928, which left behind a steelwork shell that was not rebuilt. The cause of the blaze remains unknown. The cost of the damage, covered by insurance, amounted to thousands of pounds, but there were no fatalities, as the on-site caretaker who lived on the pier had only just left his residence to sound the alarm before it was engulfed by the flames. Despite a proposal several months later to build a new pavilion at the pier's shore end, from a design prepared by St Anne's architect Arnold England, no work was carried out and the pier reopened on 24 May 1928 without a pavilion.

The next ten years saw a plan by then owners Lytham Pier & Amusements Ltd to convert the pier into the shape of a ship, but it came to nothing. As its popularity dwindled, the pier closed to visitors in 1938 and it subsequently deteriorated throughout the mid-20th century, remaining in use by anglers only. It changed hands in 1942, with the new owners intending on spending £12,000 (equivalent to £667,000 in 2024) on alterations, but they failed to be granted a license and it was subsequently put up for auction. In October 1949, it was sold for £6,250 (equivalent to £248,000 in 2024) when it was purchased at auction by Mr. Harry Kamiya, with improvement works reported to start shortly after, following the closure of the pier due to structural concerns several months prior. The pier's revenue was £620 which was predominantly derived from its entrance cafe.

From around 1952, the pier had been declared as unsafe with considerations about its future discussed through to 1957. By then, the high cost of repairs was the primary reason for the delay in deciding its future. Various schemes were proposed to get the pier back into use, such as one involving the construction of a sea wall and redecking the pier at a cost exceeding £40,000 (equivalent to £1,141,000 in 2024). Despite the kiosks at the pier's entrance remaining in use, the council decided in 1959 that they were unwilling to provide the £5000 (equivalent to £136,000 in 2024) then required for the pier's restoration. By that time, the pier was owned by Mrs Nellie Lister, executrix of the late owner Harry Kamiya and was used only by lifeboat and fisher men. A demolition order was confirmed by the Ministry of Housing and Local Government on 1 December 1959 following an eight month inquiry. It was subsequently demolished in March 1960 at a cost of £7320 (equivalent to £199,000 in 2024) including £4000 (equivalent to £80,000 in 2025) in compensation to the estate of former owner Harry Kaniya, despite a petition opposed to the plan from local residents, which gathered almost 2600 signatures.

== Reconstruction proposals ==
It was reported in May 2007 that local Conservative councillors were investigating the possibility of securing a grant to reconstruct the pier. Councillor Richard Fulford-Brown believes that if the circumstances regarding the pier's demolition were an issue today, it would be considerably more difficult to follow through with it and takes the view that a pier visitor attraction offers something interesting for residents and visitors alike. A similar suggestion had previously been made by a local architect, who proposed an eco-friendly boardwalk complete with a viewing station. As of 2007, Lytham St Annes Civic Society were opposed to any reconstruction proposal on the grounds that the town centre should be protected, especially as there are already piers in nearby Lytham St Annes (St Anne's Pier) and Blackpool (North Pier, Central Pier and South Pier) respectively.
