= Lytham St Annes Hockey Club =

English field hockey club

Lytham St Annes Hockey Club is based at Lytham Cricket and Sports Club on Church Rd, Lytham, Lancashire, England. It comprises 4 men's and 3 ladies' sides with the men's 1st XI competing in the North Hockey League Division 2 West and the ladies' 1st XI competing in North Women's Hockey League Division 2 (West). All teams play their home games at local school astroturf pitches at AKS Lytham and at Lytham St. Annes High Technology College.
