= St Thomas' Church, St Anne's-on-the-Sea =

Coordinates: 53.7474°N 3.0244°W

St Thomas', St Anne's-on-the-Sea
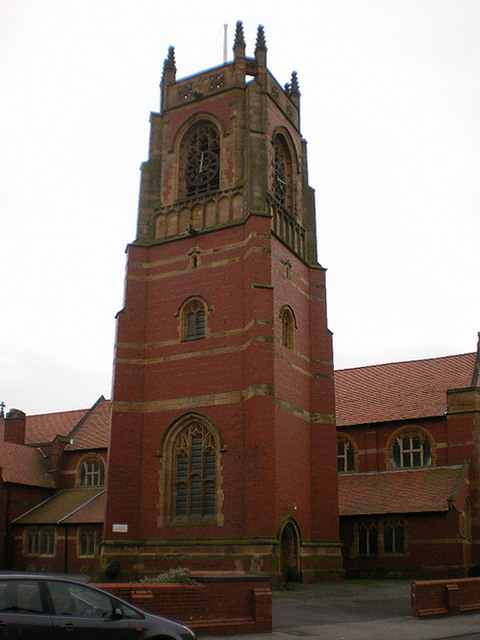

- Location in Lytham St Annes
- OS grid reference: SD 32538 28381
- Location: St Anne's-on-the-Sea, Lancashire
- Country: England
- Denomination: Anglican

History
- Status: Parish church

Architecture
- Functional status: Active
- Heritage designation: Grade II
- Architect: Austin and Paley
- Completed: 1905

Administration
- Province: York
- Diocese: Blackburn
- Archdeaconry: Lancaster
- Deanery: Kirkham

St Thomas' Church is an Anglican church in St Anne's-on-the-Sea, a town on the Fylde coastal plain in Lancashire, England. It is an active parish church in the Diocese of Blackburn and the archdeaconry of Lancaster. Designed by Austin and Paley, it is recorded in the National Heritage List for England as a designated Grade II listed building.

== History and administration ==
St Anne's-on-the-Sea was developed as a seaside resort in the 19th century, and its first church was St Anne's, completed in 1873. The parish of St Thomas dates from 1893 when a small mission church of wood and corrugated iron was built in Orchard Road. When it was clear that a larger and more permanent church was needed, a list was started for subscriptions. Land for the new church was provided by local landowner John Talbot Clifton and brewer Robert Slater Boddington gave £500. Construction began in 1899 to a design by Lancaster-based firm Austin and Paley. The architects had won the commission in a competition held in 1892, and the plans had been agreed by 1895. The planned tower, porch, and two bays of the nave were not built at this time. As then built, the church provided seating for 600 people. The church was dedicated to St Thomas in 1900 by James Moorhouse, the Bishop of Manchester. The tower, porch and extra bays for the nave were added in 1904–05, increasing the seating to 670.

On 15 February 1993, St Thomas' was designated a Grade II listed building. The Grade II designation—the third highest of the three grades—is for buildings that are "nationally important and of special interest". An active church in the Church of England, St Thomas' is part of the diocese of Blackburn, which is in the Province of York. It is in the archdeaconry of Lancaster and the Deanery of Kirkham. Both the parish and benefice are called St Thomas.

== Architecture ==
=== Exterior ===
St Thomas' is constructed of red Accrington brick in English garden wall bond, with stonework around the windows in cream Yorkshire stone, and arches, arcades and pillars of red sandstone; the roofs are of red tile. The plan consists of a nave, with a tower to the north-west, aisles to the north and south, and a chancel with north transept.

The nave has six bays and clerestoried windows. The tower is square and has diagonal buttresses. It has intricate three-light belfry louvres, and a parapet with pinnacles. The tower is attached to the nave by a covered arcade.

=== Interior and furnishings ===
Stained glass in the church includes work by Powells, G. P. Hutchinson, Carl Edwards and Shrigley & Hunt.

== External features ==
The churchyard contains the war grave of a Royal Artillery soldier of World War II.

== See also ==
- Listed buildings in Saint Anne's on the Sea
- List of ecclesiastical works by Austin and Paley (1895–1914)
