= Burlingtons Bar =

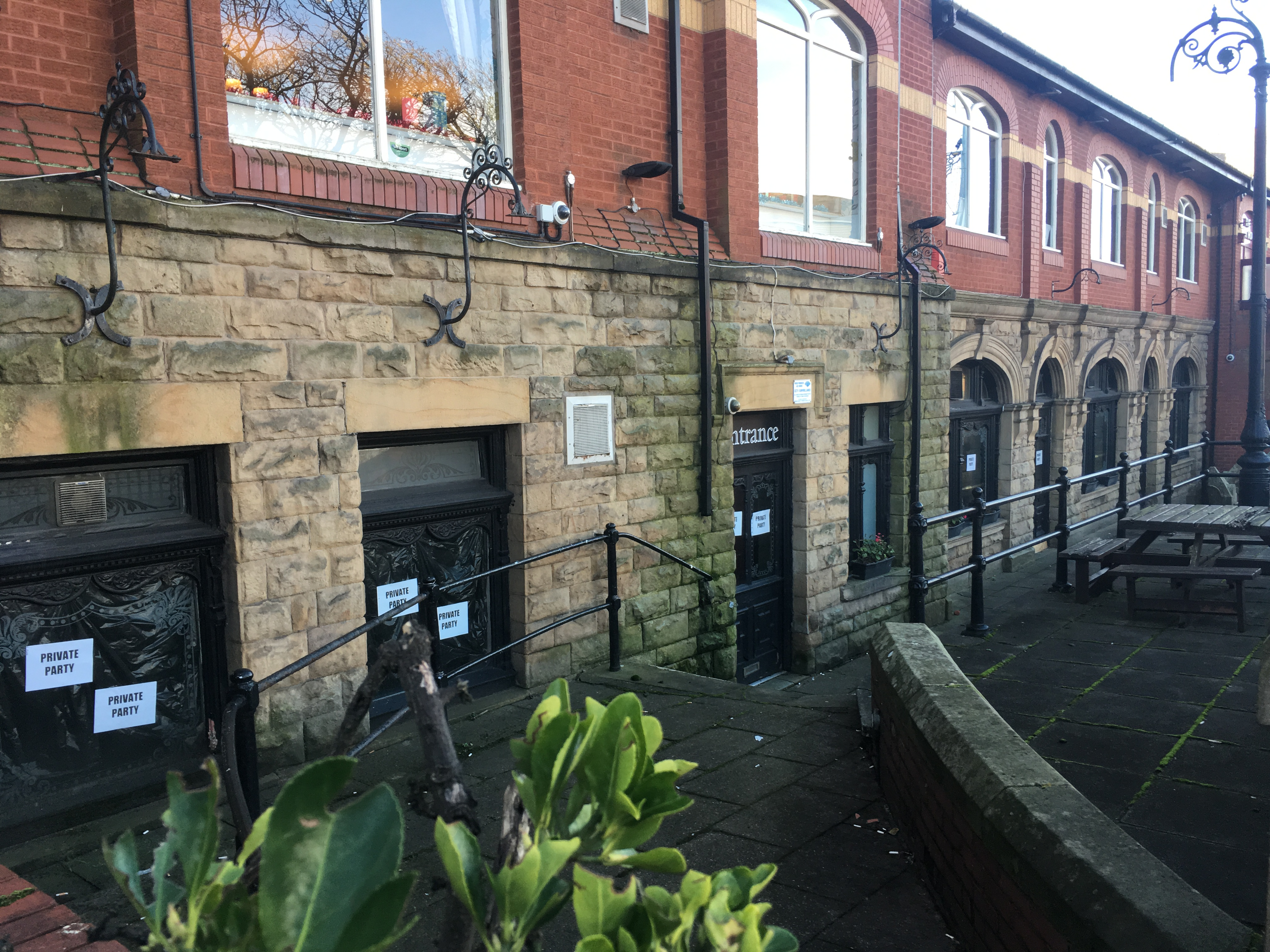

- Location within Lytham St Annes
- Former names: Burlington Bertie’s; Tiles

General information
- Type: Bar room under a public house
- Location: St Annes Road West, St Annes-on-the-Sea, Lancashire, England
- Coordinates: 53.7517°N 3.0316°W
- Opened: 1895
- Owner: Greene King Brewery

Website
- www.gkmeetandeat.co.uk/locations/town-house-lytham-st-annes

Listed Building – Grade II
- Official name: Burlingtons Bar (at the Town House)
- Designated: 10 February 2016
- Reference no.: 1428564

Burlingtons Bar is under the Town House public house in Lytham St Annes, Lancashire, England. It is recorded in the National Heritage List for England as a designated Grade II listed building.

The bar is on the Campaign for Real Ale's National Inventory of Historic Pub Interiors. The floor, wall, and bar are all completely tiled.

It was built in 1895 under St Anne's Hotel. The hotel was demolished in 1985, but Burlingtons Bar was retained as the basement for the Crescent Pub, later renamed the Town House.

== See also ==
- Listed buildings in Saint Anne's on the Sea
