= The Vision of Catherine of Aragon =

Painting by Henry Fuseli

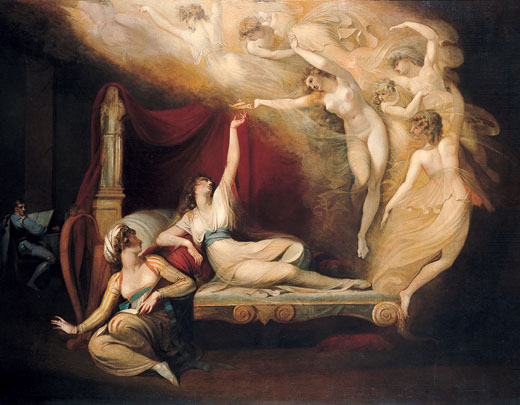
- Artist: Henry Fuseli
- Year: 1781
- Medium: Oil on canvas
- Dimensions: 147.3 cm × 210.8 cm (58.0 in × 83.0 in)
- Location: Lytham St Annes Art Collection; Lytham St Annes

The Vision of Catherine of Aragon, or Queen Catherine's Vision, is a painting in oils on canvas by the Swiss artist Henry Fuseli, created in 1781. The work is held at the Lytham St Annes Art Collection, in Lytham St Annes, Lancashire, England.

== Description ==
This canvas represents a passage from the play Henry VIII, Act IV, scene 2, by William Shakespeare, where Queen Catherine of Aragon has a macabre dream of her own end after being banished in favour of Anne Boleyn. The Queen is lying on her deathbed, and she raises her left arm towards the crown offered to her by several partially naked female ghostly apparitions, in an emotion that surprises her servant sitting at her bedside, at the foot of a lyre and a sculpture. Both women are dressed in ancient classical attire, not in the 16th-century fashion. In the Shakespearean text the spirits wear garlands and oval masks known as visards, while holding palm or laurel branches, but Fuseli omitted these details. In the background there is the deposed Queen's gaoler, almost hidden in the darkness.

There is a painting depicting Catherine alone (probably a study for this work) at the Victoria and Albert Museum in London. In the same museum there is also a painting that focuses exclusively on the female apparitions.

== Provenance ==
The painting was commissioned by the fifth baronet of Upton Sussex, Sir Robert Smyth, in 1780. After being exhibited at the Royal Academy Exhibition of 1781 at Somerset House, the work was inherited by his son and later by son of the latter, until it was auctioned in 1878. The work became part of the collection of Leonard Redmayne, and upon his death in 1906 it was inherited by his children. In 1931 the painting was loaned to Lytham St Annes Town Council, and in 1950 it became part of the town's art collection.
