= Lytham St Annes Art Collection =

Art museum in England

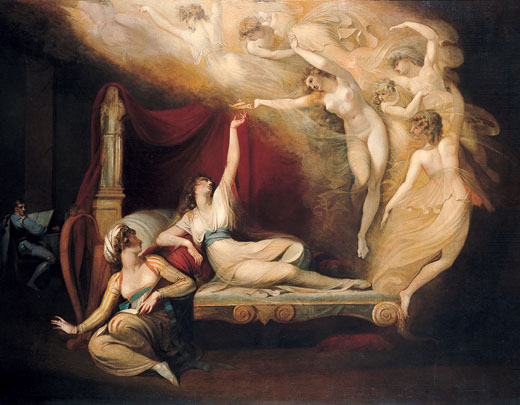
The Vision of Catherine of Aragon, by Henry Fuseli, one of the paintings in the collection.

The Lytham St Annes Art Collection is a public art collection of over 240 artworks in Lytham St Annes, Lancashire. Fylde Borough Council are the custodians of the paintings, sculptures, prints and artefacts that are mostly held within the Lytham St Annes Town Hall. The collection was started in 1925 by the donation of Herd Lassie, painted by Richard Ansdell, to the townspeople of Lytham St Annes, Lancashire. It was donated by John Booth (1857–1941), son of the founder of the grocery store chain Booths. The collection of 25 works is now one of the largest public collections of Ansdell's paintings.

One of the most notable paintings in the collection is The Vision of Catherine of Aragon (also called Queen Katherine's Dream) by Henry Fuseli, which is estimated to be worth about £1.5-2 million, according to a 2013 valuation by Christie's, making it by far the most valuable item in the collection.

In 2008 the Fylde Gallery was opened above the Booths grocery store in Lytham to display some of the collection, and it is periodically open to the public. In June 2013 the Fylde Decorative and Fine Arts Society was awarded £24,000 from the Heritage Lottery Fund to promote the collection.

== Selected artists from the Lytham St Annes Art Collection ==
Selected artists include:

- Allegrain, Christophe-Gabriel
- Allom, Thomas
- Andreotti, Frederico
- Andrieux, Alfred Louis
- Ansdell, Richard
- Arnold, Patience
- Balshaw, Fred
- Baratti Fillipo
- Barber, Charles Burton
- Barker, W D
- Baxter, George
- Bayer, J
- Bennett, Alfred J
- Bennett, E
- Bond, Henry Winsor
- Bond, William J J C
- Bough, Samuel
- Boulard Il, Auguste
- Brierley, Anne
- Brown, Mather
- Brooke, Percy
- Buzzi, Achille
- Caffieri Hector
- Cant, Leslie
- Carter, Samuel John
- Catterall, F W
- Cattermole, Charles
- Chambers, George Junior
- Chauvel, Théophile
- Cignani, Carlo
- Clausen, Sir George
- Constable, John
- Constantine, George Hamilton
- Cooper, Thomas Sidney
- Cox, David
- Craft, Percy R
- Creswick, Thomas
- Crossley, W
- Crouse, Max (previously M Clause)
- Currie, Jessie
- de Blaas, Eugene
- de Breanski, Alfred Snr
- de Heusch, Jacob
- de Hoog, Bernard
- Dumont, Edme
- van Dyck, Anthony
- Dyson, Louise Hardy
- Earl, Thomas William
- Eastwood, Walter
- Elliot, H
- Elliot, James
- Elmore, Alfred W
- Ensor, Mary Annie
- Evans, Bernard Walter
- Faed, Thomas
- Farnetti, D
- Farquharson, Joseph
- Fielding, Anthony Vandyke Copley
- Fitton, William
- Fox, Henry Charles
- Franchini, F S
- Frith, William Powell
- Frost, William Edward (attributed to the Circle of)
- Fuchs, Therese
- Fuseli, Henry
- Gleave, W H
- Glendening, Alfred Augustus Jnr
- Glindoni, Henry Gillard
- Graham, Peter
- Greenhalgh, Thomas
- Grundy, Cuthbert Cartwright
- Hague, Joshua Anderson
- Hardy, Frederick Daniel
- Hayes, Edwin
- Hayes, George
- Herbert, Alfred
- Hester, R Wallace
- Hider, Frank
- Hines, Frederick W
- Hirst, Norman
- Hodgkinson, Peter
- Hogarth, William
- Hoppner, John
- Howarth, Albany E
- Huggins, William
- Ireland, Thomas Tayler
- Jackson, Fred Williams
- Kay-Hilton Jacqueline
- Kirchner, Raphael
- Landini, Andrea
- Landseer, Edwin Henry (after)
- Landseer, Thomas
- Langlois, Mark William
- Laporte, Emile Henri
- Leader, Benjamin Williams (after)
- Linnell, John
- Llangl, H
- Longshaw, Frank William
- Lutyens, Charles Augustus Henry
- Macullum, John Thomas Hamilton
- MacWhirter, John
- Marshall, Thomas Falcon
- McArthur, A E
- Mennie, James
- Millais, (after) John Everett
- Millington, Caroline Alice
- Mole, John Henry
- Morgan, John
- Morland, George
- Morris, Alfred
- Morris, John Charles
- Morris, J D
- Mulraney
- Munkácsy, Mihály
- Myers, E
- Oswald, C W
- Partington, Harold
- Pedder, John
- Piffard, Harold H
- Pratt, Joseph Bishop
- Procter, Henry
- Prout, John Skinner
- Pyne, James Baker
- Rembrandt, van Rijn (after)
- Rheam, Henry M
- Richardson, Charles
- Rigaud, Hyacinthe
- Rigby, Cuthbert
- Rinaldi, Rinaldo
- Robury, Steve
- Roe, Clarence H
- Romney, George
- Sadler, Walter Dendy (after)
- Schneider, N N
- Scott, Hugh Berry
- Shaw, John
- Shayer, William
- Sheffield, George Jnr
- Smith, James Burrell
- Sonn, B (after Claus Meyer)
- Spence, Benjamin Edward
- Thompson
- Topham, Francis William
- Towers, Samuel
- Tucker, Edward Snr
- Turner, Joseph Mallord William
- Verboeckhoven, Eugene Joseph
- Vichi, Ferdinando
- Warburton, Stanley
- Wardleworth, J L
- Wasse, Arthur
- West, Benjamin (follower of)
- Westall, Richard
- White, Kathleen
- Williams, Harry (John Henry)
- Woodhead, Walter
- Woodhouse, Susan
- Woodhouse, William Arnold
