= St Annes Pier =

Victorian pier in Lancashire, England

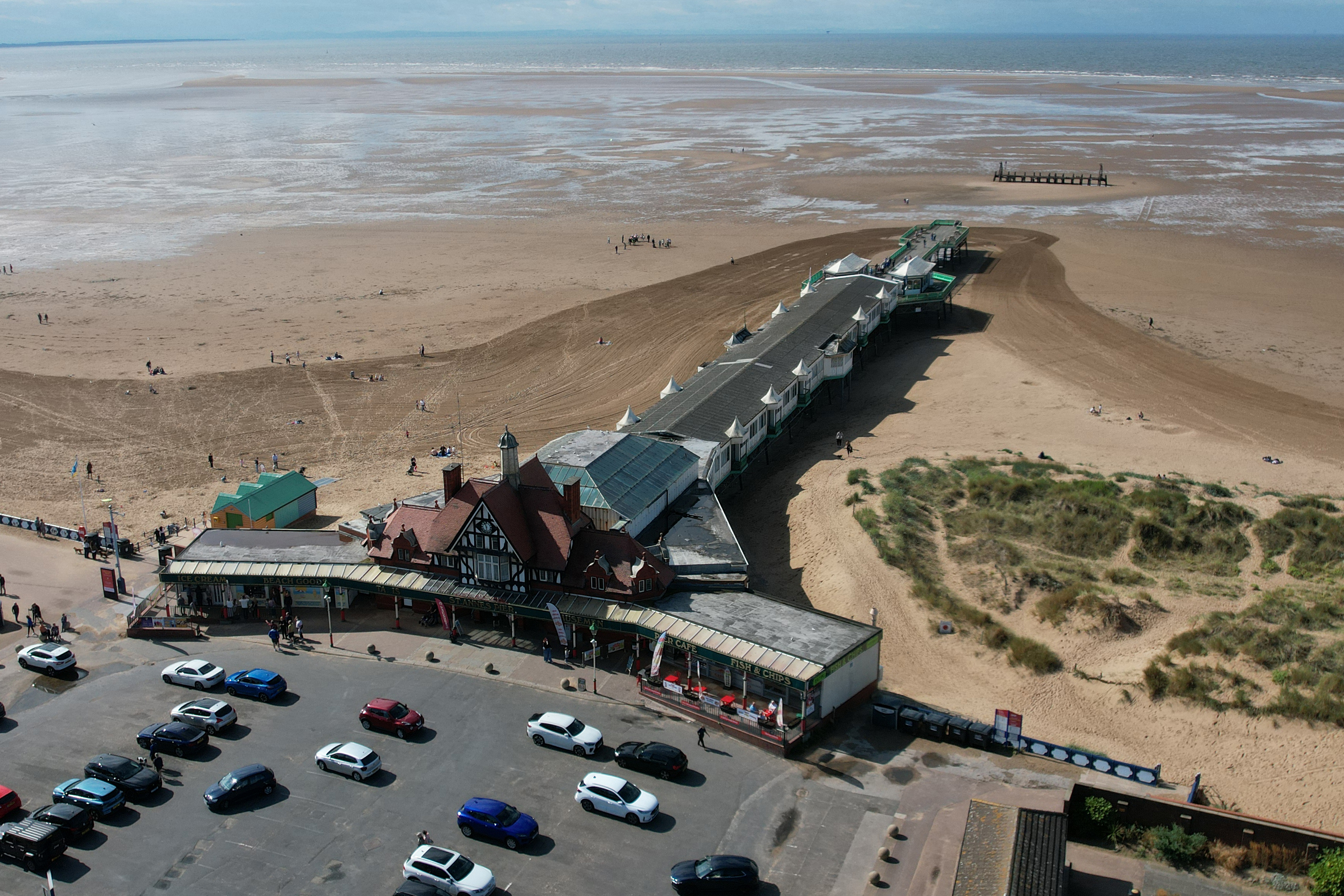
- St Anne's Pier as of August 2026
- Type: Victorian Pleasure Pier
- Location: St Annes-on-the-Sea, Lancashire
- Coordinates: 53.7496°N 3.0351°W

Characteristics
- Total length: 600 feet (180 m)
- Width: 34 feet (10 m)

History
- Designer: Alfred Dowson (1880–1885); Garlick and Sykes (1901–1904)
- Opening date: 15 June 1885
- Location in Lytham St Annes Location on the Fylde

St Annes Pier is a Victorian era pleasure pier in the English seaside resort of St Annes-on-the-Sea, Lancashire. It lies on the estuary of the River Ribble. The pier, designed by Alfred Dowson, was completed in 1885 and was one of the earliest public buildings in St Annes, a 19th-century planned town. The pier was originally intended to be a sedate promenading venue for the resort's visitors, but attractions were later added. Changes made to the estuary channels to improve access to Preston Dock left the pier on dry land and ended its steamer services to Blackpool and Liverpool.

A Tudor-style entrance was built in 1899. Early 20th-century additions included a Moorish-style pavilion in 1904 and the Floral Hall in 1910. The Moorish Pavilion was destroyed by fire in 1974, shortly after the town's centenary; the Floral Hall burned down in 1982. Originally 914 feet (279 m) long, the pier was reduced to 600 feet (180 m) by the demolition of the seaward end. English Heritage has designated the pier a Grade II listed building.

== Background ==
St Annes-on-the-Sea is a planned seaside resort on the Fylde coast, at the mouth of the River Ribble, in Lancashire. It was developed in the 19th century, largely by the St Anne's on the Sea Land and Building Company. The company was formed in 1874 and leased land for the new town from the estate of the local Clifton family. Towards the end of the 19th century, pleasure piers became a common feature of English seaside resorts, and by the 1870s there were already two piers in nearby Blackpool (now called North and Central Piers), one in Southport and one 3.5 miles (5.6 km) away in Lytham. The wording of the land company's original lease indicates that a pier was probably planned for St Annes from its beginning. A subsidiary, the St Annes-on-the-Sea Pier and Improvements Company was formed in 1877. The company directors believed that a pier at St Annes would offer visitors better conditions for fishing and boating than those at neighbouring resorts.

== Construction ==
There was some delay in building the new pier because of an economic downturn. Engineers inspected the site in 1879, and construction began in 1880. The architect was Alfred Dowson. The pier is constructed of cast iron columns and lattice girders with wooden decking and intricate decorative iron-work on the deck. The columns were sunk to a depth of 50 feet (15 m). The original structure was 914 feet (279 m) long and 19 feet (5.8 m) wide. It included a band kiosk built of glass and iron. Construction cost £18,000 and took more than five years. The pier was opened by Frederick Stanley on 15 June 1885, in a ceremony attended by local dignitaries, school children, the Preston Militia band, and the Order of Mechanics. The opening featured the launch of a lifeboat named the Laura Janet, whose crew was lost the following year in the Southport and St Anne's lifeboats disaster.

In 1891 a wooden landing jetty at the end of the pier was extended, in an L shape, by engineering and architecture firm Garlick and Sykes. The new iron extension was three storeys high and measured 120 feet (37 m) long by 90 feet (27 m) wide. After its addition, the pier was 945 feet (288 m) in length. The jetty was used for steamer services from Blackpool and Liverpool. The passing of the Ribble Navigation and Preston Dock Act 1883 led to dredging of the river channels to improve access to Preston Dock. These changes to the estuary meant that the pier was eventually left on dry land, ruining the resort's steamer trade.

A new entrance building was constructed in 1899 to a design by J. D. Harker. This was built in the mock Tudor style of red brick with imitation timber framing. In 1901 work began to enlarge the pier and add a Moorish-style pavilion. It had a seating capacity of 920 and measured 84 feet (26 m) by 56 feet (17 m). The width of the pier was increased to 34 feet (10 m). These additions were also undertaken by Garlick and Sykes and opened on 2 April 1904.

In 1910, further additions included the Floral Hall, adjacent to the Moorish Pavilion at the seaward end. The hall—a winter garden and concert hall—had a seating capacity of 850; it was built of steel and plate glass to a design by Arnold England.

== Attractions ==
In the late 19th and early 20th centuries, the developers of St Annes were keen to attract a more refined market than Blackpool's working-class excursionists. The pier was originally intended to provide little more than a sedate promenading facility for the resort's visitors; initially the only other attractions were a band kiosk and a sweet shop.

The pier's Floral Hall hosted concerts and music hall acts. Its first resident orchestra was Miss Kate Erl and Her Ladies Orchestra. (Note: Shakeshaft (2008) spells the name Erl, Easdown (2009) spells it Ertl while Harrison (1971) spells it Earl.) Subsequent conductors of the pier's orchestra were Clarice Dunnington, William Rees, Lionel Johns and Norman George. Artists who have performed on the pier include Gracie Fields, Leslie Henson, Russ Conway and George Formby.

In 1954, an amusement arcade was added to the pier; this now occupies three quarters of the length of the structure. Alterations later that decade included the addition of a restaurant and replacement of the decking. By the 1970s the pier's amusements included crazy golf, a miniature zoo and live theatre performances.

== Damage and recent history ==
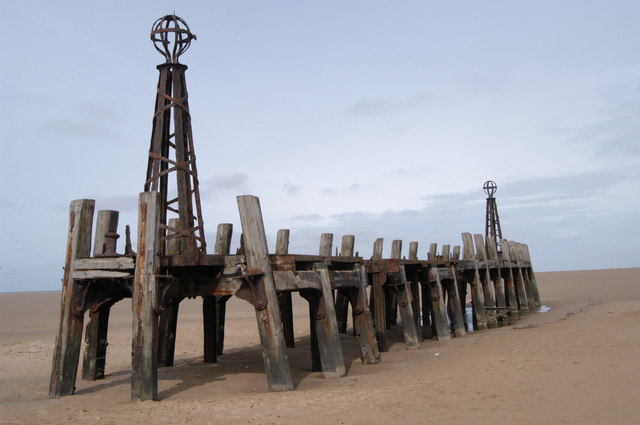
The remains of the pier's landing jetty

In 1962 the holdings of the St Anne's on the Sea Land and Building Company (including the pier) were bought by the Amalgamated Investment Company, based in London. Some alterations to the pier were made by the new owners, including the addition of an aviary and a reptile house. The Floral Hall was refurbished and turned into a Tyrolean-style beer garden.

A centenary concert for the town by violinist Yehudi Menuhin was held on 7 June 1974 and attended by Anne, Princess Royal. On the night of 20 July, the Moorish Pavilion (known from 1970 as the Sultan's Palace) was destroyed in a fire.

On 6 December 1976, following the liquidation of the Amalgamated Investment Company, the pier was bought by the Webb family for £30,000. They initially planned to repair the fire damage. The Floral Hall, which had been adjacent to the Moorish Pavilion, was destroyed by fire on 23 July 1982; the pavilions were deemed irreparable and the seaward end of the pier was demolished. Following protests against the demolition by campaigners, the local council decided that the final 150 feet (46 m) should be retained to protect the character of the pier, so the remains of the ruined landing jetty still exist. The pier, most of which is enclosed, now ends with an uncovered stretch of deck that opens out into two hexagonal platforms with small pavilions and shelters. The length of the remaining intact structure is 600 feet (180 m). The pier's 21st-century attractions include the amusement arcade, cafés and shops; the seaward end is usually closed to visitors.

English Heritage designated St Annes Pier a Grade II listed building on 21 September 1973. It is listed as part of a group of promenade structures that includes a bandstand, a lifeboat monument, a pavilion and two shelters. Lynn F. Pearson (1991) writes that the pier's Moorish Pavilion and Floral Hall were "two of the best [pier pavilions] in design terms". According to Chris Mawson and Richard Riding (2008), the pier is "well regarded" for its wrought iron work.

== Visual reporting point ==
The pier is one of nine visual reporting points (VRPs) for general aviation aircraft in the local Blackpool airspace.

== See also ==
- Listed buildings in Saint Anne's on the Sea
