= Listed buildings in Saint Anne's on the Sea =

St Annes on the Sea is a town in the Borough of Fylde, Lancashire, England. It contains 23 listed buildings that are recorded in the National Heritage List for England. Of these, one is listed at Grade II*, the middle of the three grades, and the others are at Grade II, the lowest grade. Until the 1870s the only buildings in the area now occupied by the town were scattered cottages. In 1873 the architects Maxwell and Tuke were appointed to draw up a plan for the development of the town. This has since grown to become a seaside resort and commuter town. The listed buildings include churches and associated structures, public buildings, a hotel and its boundary wall, memorials, a bank, and a former school. The structures relating to the town's function as a resort are a pier, a pavilion and shelters, fountains, and a bandstand.

== Key ==
Grade	Criteria
II*	Particularly important buildings of more than special interest
II	Buildings of national importance and special interest

== Buildings ==
Name and location	Photograph	Date	Notes	Grade
St Anne's Church; 53.75653°N 3.02266°W		1872–73	The church was designed by Paley and Austin in Gothic style, and subsequently enlarged. It is built in red brick with some pebble inlay, sandstone dressings, and a red pantile roof. The church consists of a nave and a chancel in one cell, aisles of unequal size, a south transept, a north chapel, a baptistry, and a west tower. The tower is large, in two stages, and contains a west window, decorative stone bands, clock faces, a stair turret, and a statue in a niche. At the top is a crow-stepped parapet, and crocketed corner pinnacles.	II
Lychgate and wall, St Anne's Church; 53.75570°N 3.02338°W		c. 1873–75 (probable)	The wall, about 1 metre (3 ft 3 in) high, surrounds the triangular churchyard, and is in red brick with panels of pebbles. The lych gate is open timber-framed with a red tiled roof. It is in Tudor style, and contains wooden gates.	II
Drive Methodist Church; 53.74839°N 3.03002°W		1876	The original building was a Methodist school and chapel. This became the church hall when the current church was built in 1891–92. A reading room was added in 1901 and in 1907 the church was enlarged. The original chapel is built in red brick with stone dressings and a slate roof. The other buildings are in yellow sandstone with green slate roofs. The church consists of a nave, transepts, a chancel and a steeple at the northwest. The boundary wall, gateposts and railings are included in the designation.	II
St Anne's Pier; 53.74907°N 3.03589°W		1885	There have been subsequent additions to the piers, including an entrance pavilion in 1910, but it was reduced to about half its length following a fire in 1978. It is built in cast iron with a wooden deck and includes shelters and pavilions in cast iron, glass, and wood. Much of it is enclosed as an amusement arcade, and there is open deck beyond. The entrance pavilion is symmetrical with two storeys, and includes some half-timbering, an oriel window, a jettied gable, and an octagonal lantern on the roof.	II
Laura Janet Memorial Cross; 53.75653°N 3.02299°W	—	1887	The memorial cross is in the churchyard of St Anne's Church and commemorates of the crew of the lifeboat Laura Janet who were lost in an attempted rescue in 1886. It consists of a red sandstone Celtic cross about 2.5 metres (8 ft 2 in) high. This is set on a stepped and tapering plinth on a stone base. Beneath the cross head is an inscribed panel.	II
Lifeboat Monument; 53.74898°N 3.03381°W		c. 1890	The monument, designed by W. B. Rhind, is to the memory of the crew of the lifeboat Laura Janet who were lost in an attempted rescue in 1886. It is in sandstone and consists of a pedestal in the form of a rock on a square plinth. Standing on the pedestal is a larger than life-size statue of a lifeboatman. On the south side is an inscribed panel.	II
Grand Hotel; 53.74595°N 3.02688°W		1897	The hotel by F. W. Catterall is in Jacobean style, built in red brick, sandstone, terracotta, and tiles, with some pargetting. It has a U-shaped plan consisting of a main range and two receding wings. There are three storeys, and the symmetrical main front has nine bays. At the corners are circular drums, and in the centre is a three-storey porch with a parapet and ball finials. Further out are three-storey canted bay windows with pargetted gables.	II
Boundary wall, Grand Hotel; 53.74576°N 3.02771°W	—	1897	The wall marks the southwest boundary of the grounds of the hotel. They are built in Accrington brick, and contain panels of pebbles in different patterns.	II
Burlingtons Bar; 53.75278°N 3.02976°W	—	1898	The bar was built as the basement of the St Anne's Hotel. The hotel has been replaced by a public house, the Town House, retaining the bar. The exterior of the bar is in rusticated sandstone, in a single storey with seven bays. On the front is an arcade of three large windows with segmental heads, and two round-headed doorways, all under a moulded cornice. The interior contains a scheme of ceramic tiles by Craven Dunnill, most of which has survived. The decoration includes arcades, moulded panels and mirrors, plain, floral and patterned tiles, and doors with entablatures and serpentine pediments.	II
St Thomas' Church; 53.74738°N 3.02461°W		1899–1905	The church, designed by Austin and Paley in Perpendicular style, is built in Accrington brick with sandstone dressings and red tiled roofs. It consists of a nave with a clerestory, aisles, a north transept, a chancel, and a detached northwest tower linked to the church by a passage. The tower has buttresses, a stair turret on the east, a west doorway, a bell stage decorated by blind arcading, and a parapet with paired crocketed corner pinnacles.	II
Drinking fountain 53.74734°N 3.03098°W		c. 1900	The drinking fountain in the Promenade Gardens is in cast iron, and has a two-stepped octagonal sandstone base. There is a cylindrical shaft with four decorative jambs carrying a quatrefoil basin. Above this is a tapering stanchion with concave sides, and at the top is a vase-like structure with four projecting arms. The fountain is decorated with floral motifs and birds. On the east side is a small trough for dogs.	II
Spray fountain 53.74790°N 3.03229°W		c. 1900	The fountain in the Promenade Gardens is in cast iron and has three tiers. The bottom basin is an octofoil decorated with passion flower rosettes, and in the basin are four lily pads with jets. Above is a cylindrical shaft and a large circular bowl, and above this is a slender shaft with four pelicans carrying a smaller circular bowl. On top of this is a putto on a mushroom holding a bowl containing a jet. The fountain is decorated with floral motifs, animals and birds.	II
Bandstand; 53.74921°N 3.03407°W		Late 18th to early 19th century (probable)	The bandstand has an octagonal plan and stands on a sandstone base. It has eight slender cast iron columns with fluted bases and voluted caps. At the tops are openwork brackets and spandrels. The ceiling is wooden, and there is a felted shallow polygonal roof with a wrought iron crest.	II
Octagonal pavilion 53.74873°N 3.03345°W		Late 18th to early 19th century (probable)	The octagonal structure stands on a sandstone plinth and has eight slender cast iron columns. Between these are decorated cast iron panels in the lower part, and four-light windows with triangular heads above. Over these is an openwork frieze, and a swept metal-clad roof with a wrought iron finial.	II
Promenade shelter, Boating Pool; 53.74826°N 3.03313°W		Late 18th to early 19th century (probable)	The shelter is supported by ten cast iron columns, and inside are partitions to provide back-to-back seating in the centre and more seating at the ends. The partitions are in wood below and glass above. At the top is a hipped and swept felted roof with ornamental cresting and corner finials.	II
Promenade shelter, Open Air Baths; 53.74776°N 3.03237°W	—	Late 18th to early 19th century (probable)	The shelter is supported by ten cast iron columns, and inside are partitions to provide back-to-back seating in the centre and more seating at the ends. The partitions are in wood below and glass above. At the top is a hipped and swept felted roof with ornamental cresting and corner finials.	II
Public Offices; 53.74967°N 3.03214°W		1900–02	The offices were designed by Thomas Muirhead, and are in Accrington brick with sandstone detailing and dressings, and a slate roof. The building has an L-shaped plan, with a main range at the front and a long service wing behind. The main block has two storeys and a symmetrical five-bay front. The central three bays project forward and contain a round-headed doorway, and in the upper floor are three bay windows. Elsewhere the windows are sashes.	II
District Central Library; 53.74716°N 3.02659°W		1904	The library was designed by J. D. Harker in Edwardian Baroque style. It is built in red brick with sandstone dressings and a Cumbrian slate roof. In the northwest corner is an octagonal entrance vestibule that has a round-headed doorway with a stone architrave flanked by oculi. Above this is an octagonal storey on which is a copper-clad dome surmounted by a lantern and finial. Beyond the vestibule is an open hall, and single-storey reading rooms.	II
Midland Bank; 53.75200°N 3.03085°W		c. 1904–10	The bank, designed by T. B. Whitney in Renaissance style, is in sandstone, and has a narrow rectangular plan. It has 2 1/2 storeys and a symmetrical three-bay front. In the ground floor is a round-headed entrance, there is a Venetian window in the first floor, and in the top floor is a Diocletian window in a pediment. Above this is a clock turret in an architrave with an open pediment, which is surmounted by a bell-shaped cupola with a finial.	II
College of Further Education; 53.74708°N 3.02618°W		1907	The former college was later extended. It is in Accrington brick with sandstone dressings and Westmorland slate roofs, and has an L-shaped plan. There are three lead-covered cupolas. The building has two storeys with basements, and an asymmetrical front of three bays. The round-headed doorway is flanked by attached Ionic columns. The centre and right bays have segmental pediments. The left bay has a first-floor Venetian window above which is a gable with ball finials and a smaller segmental pediment containing a coat of arms. Behind the main block is a wing of five bays.	II
War memorial 53.75290°N 3.03316°W		1923	The war memorial was designed by W. Marsden, and consists of a white granite tapering pillar on a stepped plinth. On top of the pillar is a dome, on which stands a bronze female figure with raised arms. At the base of the pillar are two more bronze sculptures; on one side a crouching soldier, and on the other a woman with a baby. Around the sides of the plinth are bronze panels depicting subjects including a soldier with a nurse, stretcher bearers, and a line of soldiers blinded by gas.	II*
Gravestone of Sir Charles Wright Macara; 53.75649°N 3.02304°W	—	1929	The gravestone is in the churchyard of St Anne's Church. It is in white stone, and consists of a cross on a stepped plinth, itself on a base. Sculpted ivy climbs up the plinth and entwines the cross. There are inscriptions on the sides of the plinth.	II
Queen Mary School; 53.74325°N 3.01119°W		1930	Originally a secondary school for girls, later converted into flats, it was designed by Rees and Holt in Georgian style. The school is built in red brick and sandstone, with sandstone dressings and Westmorland slate roofs. It has a double quadrangle plan. The entrance wing has two storeys and a symmetrical front with three bays forming an entrance, and twelve bays on each side. The central bays form a portico with Corinthian columns surmounted by a balustrade, behind which is a cupola with a weathervane.	II
