= St Anne's on the Sea Land and Building Company =

English development company

St. Anne's on the Sea Land and Building Company was formed in 1874 and played an integral part in the development of the new town of St.Anne's on the Sea from 1875. The company had its roots in the Rossendale area and the most significant investor was William John Porritt, a woollen manufacturer from Helmshore. His money contributed to the building of St Anne's and restored confidence in the project after some early problems.

== Early days of the company ==
The Clifton Family of Lytham Hall, owners of the Manor of Lytham in Lancashire, guided by their land agent James Fair began planning for a new town in the area as early as the 1840s. During the 1850s, they invested in the railway between Lytham and Blackpool which opened in 1863.

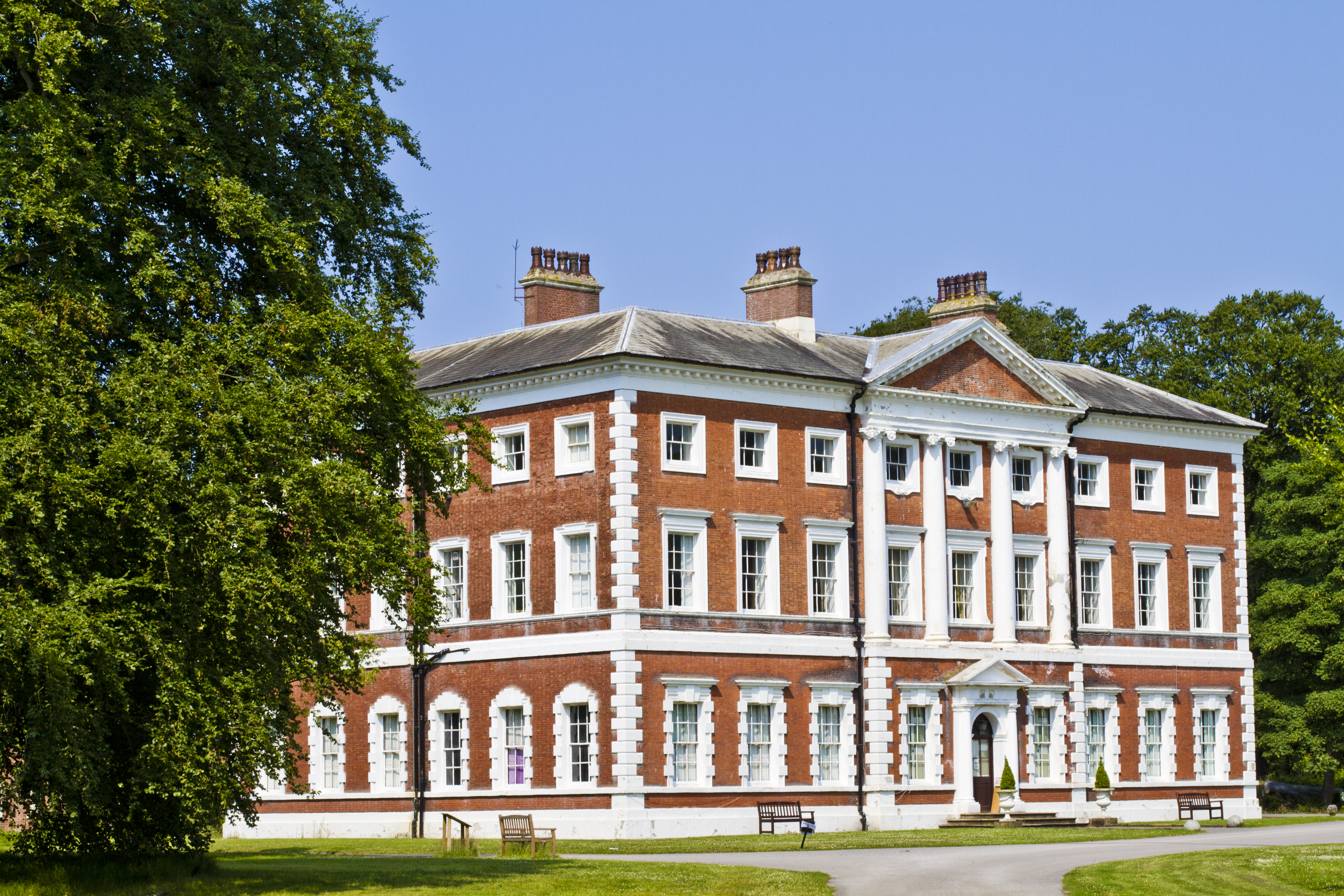
Lytham Hall front entrance

In the early 1870s, a road was laid from what is now Fairhaven to the present St Anne's Square and a further road continued to the Parish Church of St Anne which was built in 1872/3 and funded by Lady Eleanor Cecily Clifton. The church gave the name to the new town of St Anne's on the Sea.

In 1874, the St Anne's on the Sea Land and Building Company was formed by eight Rossendale men led by the chairman Joseph Wood Whitehead. This company negotiated 999 year leases with Thomas Fair who had succeeded his father James as the Clifton's agent. This company sought to develop what became known as the Square Mile in the centre of St Anne's. The architects for the project were Maxwell and Tuke of Peel Chambers, Bury. James Maxwell himself came from Haslingden in Rawtenstall and these men later went on to design Blackpool Tower.

The ambitions for an exclusive and select resort can be seen in an early company document which states, "of late years Blackpool has become so much the resort of Excursionists that a decided want is felt for a watering place which, whilst possessing the same bracing atmosphere and commanding position, shall secure a more select and better class of visitors."

The first lease between the company and the Clifton estate was signed on 14 December 1874. Work began on the development of the Promenade and the St Anne's Hotel in February 1875 and the foundation stone of St Anne's on the Sea was laid in the hotel on 31 March of that year. At the ceremony Joseph Whitehead commented:

"..perhaps many would be surprised at the scheme being taken up by Rossendale people. After relating the circumstances which led to the negotiations with Col. Clifton, he said that an arrangement was made with Mr. Fair by which 82 acres of land had been secured upon a long lease, a portion of which they had been upon that day. The company was floated and had succeeded beyond their expectations. It was their intention, as a large sum of money had been subscribed, to build as quickly as possible."

== William John Porritt and the progress of the company ==
Perhaps the most important Rossendale influence on the development of St Anne's was William John Porritt who was born in Ramsbottom in 1828.

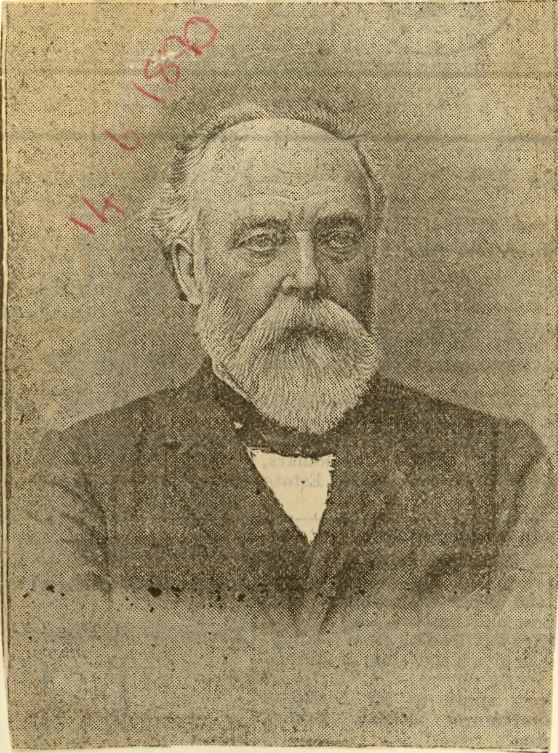
William John Porritt of Helmshore and St Anne's on the Sea

Working with his father Joseph in the firm of Joseph Porritt and Sons he built Sunnybank Mill in Helmshore in 1866 and bought Higher Mill in the same town in 1880. He was present at the laying of the foundation stone of St Anne's and soon after joined the board of the Land and Building Company, being the chairman from 1881 to 1896. The success of the scheme to develop St Anne's on the Sea wasn't guaranteed. In the 1880s and 1890s, it was struggling financially and various factors such as the opening of the pier and, most significantly, the continued investment of William Porritt ensured its success. He is particularly well known for the 'Porritt Houses' that were built north of the pier.

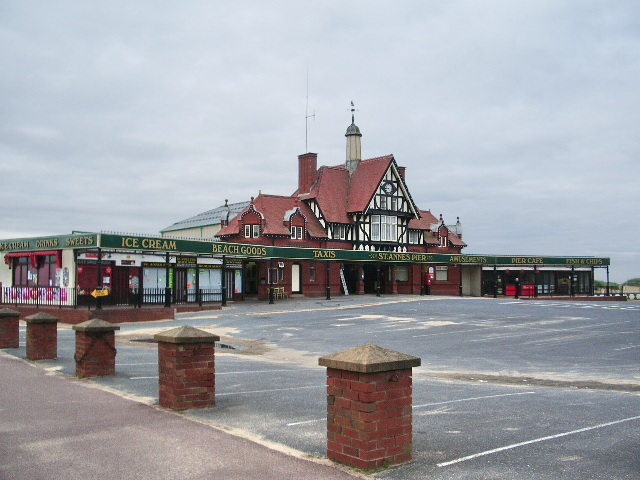
St Annes on the Sea Pier - geograph.org.uk - 956228

It's thought that he built property to the value of £100,000 in St Anne's – by today's standards he invested millions of pounds in the area.

As well as these prime-movers who wanted to invest in and oversee the development of St Anne's on the Sea other Rossendalians came to live and work in the town during the early years of its development. Some of these were evidently men of business and their families but a look in the census records also reveals many 'working' people including several individuals who came to work in the building trade in the newly developing town.

The 1890s Ordnance Survey map shows the town in the early stages of its development – the town centre is taking shape and the pier and promenade are in place. There are several churches and chapels and the Porritt houses on north promenade have been built.

The subsequent maps for 1911 and 1932 show the rapid extension of the resort with new housing going up, the expansion of the promenades, more churches being built along with the Carnegie Library and Technical School and the development of Ansdell and Fairhaven between Lytham and St Anne's.

After Porritt's death in 1896, the company continued to prosper although from the late 19th century its role became less one of development and was more concerned with leasing land and collecting ground rents. In 1951 the company was purchased by Amalgamated Investment and Property Company. This company went into receivership and ceased trading in 1979.
