= St Anne's Public Offices =

Municipal building in St Anne's, Lancashire, England

St Annes's Public Offices
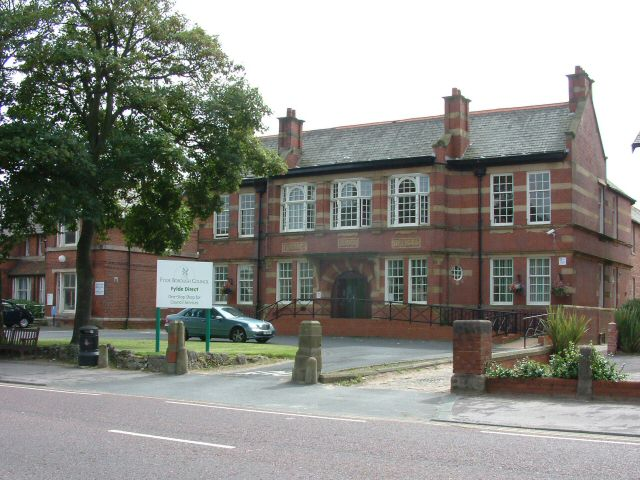
- St Anne's Public Offices

- Shown in Lancashire Location in Lytham St Annes
- 53.7497°N 3.0322°W
- Location: Clifton Drive, St Anne's-on-the-Sea

History
- Built: 1902

Site notes
- Architect: Thomas Muirhead
- Architectural style: Victorian style

Listed Building – Grade II
- Official name: Public Offices
- Designated: 28 November 2003
- Reference no.: 1390771

St Annes's Public Offices is a municipal building in Clifton Drive, St Anne's-on-the-Sea, Lancashire, England. The building, which was the headquarters of St Anne's-on-the-Sea Urban District Council, is Grade II listed.

== History ==
A local board of health was established in the rapidly developing town of St Anne's-on-the-Sea in 1878. Following significant population growth, largely associated with seaside tourism, the town became an urban district in 1894. In this context civic leaders decided to procure new public offices: the site they chose formed part of the garden of an adjacent residential property.

The new building was designed by Thomas Muirhead in the Victorian style, built in red brick with ashlar stone dressings and was officially opened by Councillor Louis Stott on 22 January 1902. The design involved a symmetrical main frontage with five bays facing onto Clifton Drive; the central section of three bays, which slightly projected forward, featured a doorway with a wide arched stone surround flanked by brackets supporting a flat canopy. There were stone panels above the doorway inscribed with the words "Public Offices" and the date of construction (1900). On the first floor there were three bay windows with curved centre lights flanked by banded pilasters. There were sash windows in the other bays on both floors. Internally, the principal room was the council chamber on the first floor.

The building was extended to the rear to create extra accommodation for council officers and their departments in 1907. It continued to serve as the headquarters of St Anne's-on-the-Sea Urban District Council until it merged with Lytham Urban District Council to form the Municipal Borough of Lytham St Annes in 1922. Lytham Urban District Council did not have a permanent headquarters at that time and so the new civic leaders decided to acquire the Southdown Hydro Hotel which was conveniently located on the South Promenade just to the rear of the public offices. The old public offices were then relegated to the role of annex to the new Lytham St Annes Town Hall, which itself became the local seat of government for the enlarged Fylde District Council in 1974.

In December 2011, Fylde District Council decided that the old public offices were surplus to requirements and proceeded to market the building for sale. In March 2012, St Annes-on-the-Sea Town Council submitted a proposal, which ultimately did not proceed, to acquire the building and convert it into a heritage centre. A blue plaque, recording the history of the old public offices, was paid for by St Annes-on-the-Sea Town Council and unveiled by Stott's grandson, Richard Stanley, on the front of the building in January 2016. The public offices were taken over by Fylde Foodbank in November 2017 but were then vacated in January 2019 as Fylde Borough Council wanted to resume marketing the building for sale.

== See also ==
- Listed buildings in Saint Anne's on the Sea
