= Lytham St Annes High School =

Coordinates: 53.7469°N 2.9979°W

LSA High School
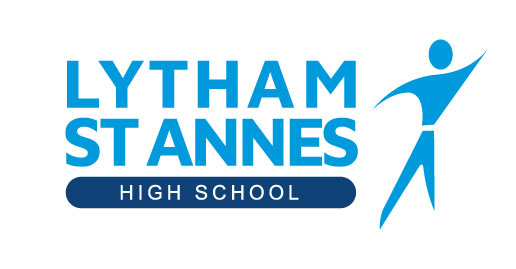

Location
- Worsley Road; Lytham St Annes, Lancashire, FY8 4GW; England

Information
- Type: Foundation school
- Established: 1955
- Local authority: Lancashire
- Department for Education URN: 119740 Tables
- Ofsted: Reports
- Headteacher: Gill Clegg
- Gender: Coeducational
- Age: 11 to 16
- Enrolment: 1630
- Website: http://www.lythamhigh.lancs.sch.uk

Lytham St Annes High School is a community school maintained by Lancashire County Education Authority. It is an 11–16 Comprehensive.

== History ==
- 1955 Ansdell County Secondary School Opens.
- 1955-1997 Lytham St. Annes High School
- 1997 School gains Technology College status and becomes known as Lytham St. Annes High Technology College.
- 2004 School awarded Artsmark Silver Award.
- 2007 School also gains Performing Arts status and becomes known as LSA Technology and Performing Arts College.
- 2010 Outstanding School status awarded by OFSTED
- 2020 Name changed to Lytham St Annes High School

== Notable former pupils ==
=== Sports ===
- Kieran Brookes – Rugby union player who plays for Northampton Saints and England.
- John Hills – footballer/coach (Blackpool, Everton)
- Scott McNiven – Footballer Oldham Athletic A.F.C, Oxford United F.C., Mansfield Town F.C., Chester City F.C., Hyde United F.C.
- David McNiven (footballer, born 1978) – Footballer Oldham Athletic A.F.C, York City F.C., Hamilton Academical F.C., Queen of the South F.C., Hyde United F.C., twin brother of Scott McNiven
- Jamie Milligan – Footballer Everton F.C., Blackpool F.C., Coach at the Blackpool F.C. Centre of Excellence.

=== Music and acting ===
- Dean Lennox Kelly – actor; best known for his role in Shameless
- Craig Kelly – Actor; best known for his roles as Vince Tyler in the Channel 4 television series Queer as Folk and as Luke Strong in Coronation Street. Trick or Treat (2020) that also starred his brother Dean Lennox Kelly
- Joni Fuller – Singer-songwriter; awarded 'Best Female Artist' at the Exposure Music Awards 2010 and later featured as 'one to watch' by PRS for Music
- Danny Howard – Radio 1 DJ
- Craig Parkinson – Actor. Misfits (TV series), Line of Duty, Prey
