= St Anne's Church, St Anne's-on-the-Sea =

Coordinates: 53.7565°N 3.0226°W

St Anne's, St Annes-on-the-Sea
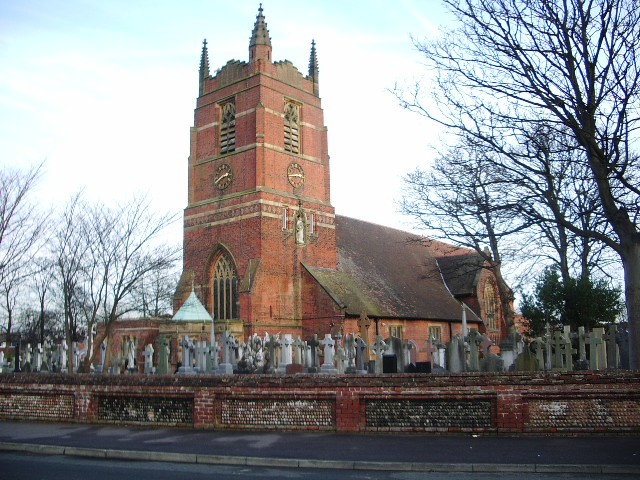
- St Anne's from the south-west

- Location in Lytham St Annes
- OS grid reference: SD 32675 29392
- Location: St Annes-on-the-Sea, Lancashire
- Country: England
- Denomination: Anglican
- Churchmanship: Anglo-Catholic

History
- Status: Parish church

Architecture
- Functional status: Active
- Heritage designation: Grade II
- Completed: 1873

Administration
- Province: York
- Diocese: Blackburn
- Archdeaconry: Lancaster
- Deanery: Kirkham

Clergy
- Vicar: Vacant

St Anne's Church is the Anglican parish church of St Annes-on-the-Sea, a town on the Fylde coast in Lancashire, England. It is an active Church of England parish church in the Diocese of Blackburn and the archdeaconry of Lancaster. It is recorded in the National Heritage List for England as a designated Grade II listed building.

== History and administration ==
St Anne's Church was built in 1872–73 as a chapel of ease to St Cuthbert's Church, Lytham, and was one of the first buildings to be constructed in what would become St Annes-on-the-Sea. The land for the church was donated by the local Clifton family. It was designed by Lancaster architects Paley and Austin at a cost of £4,229 (equivalent to £400,000 in 2025). St Anne's became an independent ecclesiastical parish in 1877. The seaside resort that grew up around the church took its name from it. In 1885–1886 the church was enlarged by Richard Knill Freeman who added a transept, vestry and, to the north, an aisle. A tower was added in 1890, and a lady chapel in 1909. In 1919 the successor in the Lancaster architectural practice, Henry Paley, added a baptistry, followed by repairs in and a memorial vestry in 1929–31.

St Anne's was designated a Grade II listed building by English Heritage on 15 February 1993. The Grade II designation—the third highest of the three grades—is for buildings that are "nationally important and of special interest". An active church in the Church of England, St Anne's is part of the diocese of Blackburn, which is in the Province of York. It is in the archdeaconry of Lancaster and the Deanery of Kirkham. Both the parish and benefice are called St Anne (Heyhouses).

== Architecture ==
=== Exterior ===
The church is constructed in a mixed Gothic style of red brick in English bond with sandstone dressings; the roof has red tiles. Its plan consists of a nave and chancel under one roof, a west tower, north and south aisles, south transept, a baptistery west of the tower and a memorial lady chapel to the north of the chancel.

The tower is square and has two stages, buttresses on the west side, and a stair turret. It has a stepped parapet with corner pinnacles.

=== Interior and furnishings ===
There is an organ chamber with an arch that has overlapping brick and basketwork. The lady chapel has a reredos in Caen stone. Stained glass includes work by John Hayward, and by E. H. Jewitt of the Lancaster-based firm Shrigley and Hunt.

== Churchyard ==
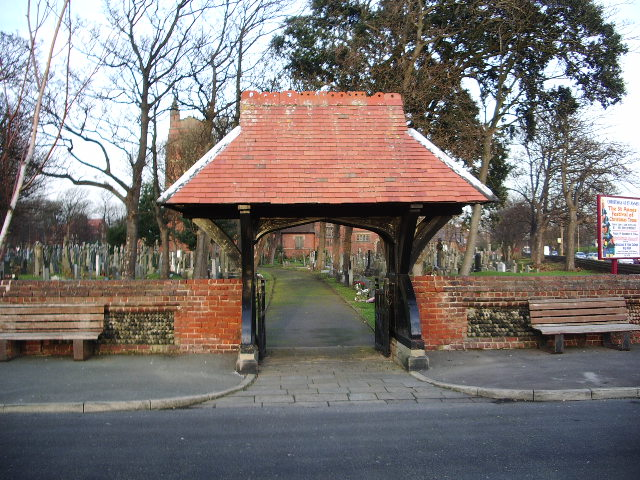
Lychgate to churchyard of St Anne's

The churchyard of St Anne's is triangular. There is a sandstone memorial to six members of the St Anne's Laura Janet lifeboat crew who died attempting to rescue the Mexico in the 1886 Southport and St Anne's lifeboats disaster. A memorial to more of the crew members that were lost is in the churchyard of St Cuthbert's in Lytham. The footballer and manager Harry Catterick is buried in the churchyard.

The churchyard is accessed by a rectangular Tudor-style lychgate, built of timber with a roof of red tile. The churchyard is enclosed by a red brick wall. Together, the lychgate and boundary wall have been given a Grade II designation from English Heritage.

== See also ==
- Listed buildings in Saint Anne's on the Sea
- List of ecclesiastical works by Paley and Austin
