= Lytham St Annes =

Town in Lancashire, England

Coordinates: 53.752°N 3.030°W

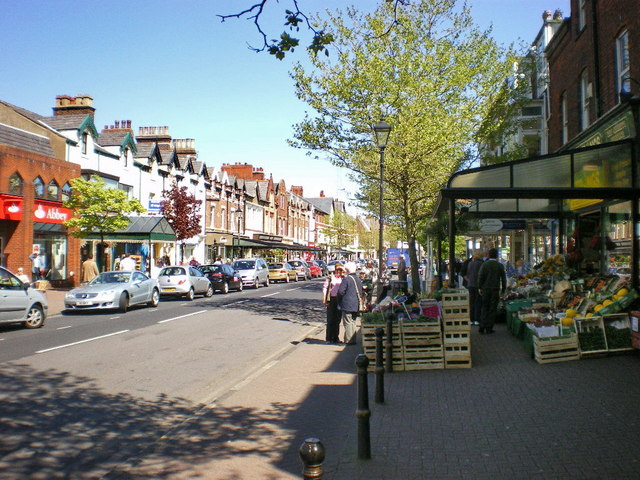
- Clifton Street, Lytham (2009)

- Shown within Fylde Borough Shown within the Fylde Location within Lancashire
- Population: 42,695 (Built up area, 2021)
- OS grid reference: SD322289
- District: Fylde
- Shire county: Lancashire
- Region: North West
- Country: England
- Sovereign state: United Kingdom
- Post town: LYTHAM ST. ANNES
- Postcode district: FY8
- Dialling code: 01253
- Police: Lancashire
- Fire: Lancashire
- Ambulance: North West
- UK Parliament: Fylde

Lytham St Annes (/ˈlɪðəm sənt ˈænz/) is a seaside town in the Borough of Fylde, Lancashire, England. It is located on the Fylde coast, directly south of Blackpool, on the Ribble Estuary. The population of the built-up area at the 2021 census was 42,695.

The town is made up of four areas: Lytham, Ansdell, Fairhaven and St Annes-on-the-Sea. Lytham is the oldest settlement and the parish of Lytham used to cover the whole area. St Annes was founded as a new seaside resort in the 1870s on open land at the western end of the parish. From 1878, the two towns were administered separately; Fairhaven and Ansdell were part of Lytham. They were reunited in 1922 under the compound name Lytham St Annes. A civil parish called Saint Anne's on the Sea was created in 2005 to cover the western part of the built-up area.

Lytham St Annes has four golf courses and links, the most notable being the Royal Lytham & St Annes Golf Club which regularly hosts the Open Championship.

Lytham St Annes is a reasonably affluent area, with residents' earnings among the highest in the North of England.

== Towns and districts ==
Lytham St Annes consists of four main areas:

=== Lytham ===
The name Lytham comes from the Old English hlithum, plural of hlith meaning '(place at) the slopes'.

The Green, a strip of grass running between the shore and the main coastal road, is a Lytham landmark; the restored Windmill and Old Lifeboat House Museum are here. The Green overlooks the estuary of the River Ribble, with Welsh mountains seen beyond. The centre of Lytham has several notable buildings, including the former public library, Lytham railway station, the market hall, the Clifton Arms Hotel and Lytham Methodist Church.

From 1961, HM Land Registry operated offices in a building known as Birkenhead House on East Beach, overlooking the Green and the estuary. The large three-storey building was built for the purpose; it closed in 2006 following the merger of the Land Registry's Warton and Lytham offices. In 2012, the site was purchased by Helen and Damian Broughton to create offices for their financial services company, the Danbro Group. Part of the building was demolished and the rest remodelled with the addition of a fourth storey; it reopened in 2015 as Jubilee House. Besides housing the Danbro headquarters, the building is let to a number of small companies.

Until the middle of the 20th century, the Clifton family was the leading family in Lytham and two of the town's main thoroughfares are named in their honour, with the main shopping street being named Clifton Street and one of two roads to Blackpool being Clifton Drive. Their estate on the outskirts of Lytham and Ansdell originally occupied a large area. Lytham Hall, the family seat, remained in the family's ownership until 1963, after which time it was passed on to Guardian Royal Exchange Insurance, and then to Lytham Town Trust in 1997. The grounds of the Hall are open during the week and on Sunday and events are organised, such as open-air plays and car shows. Several of the ornate gates to the estate and much of the distinctive pebble-bricked boundary wall survive. The parish church for Lytham is St Cuthbert's Church, on Church Road.

Lytham is the location of the Foulnaze cockle fishery. The fishery has only opened the cockle beds on the Lancashire coast three times in twenty years, most recently in August 2013.

Lytham Library closed in September 2016, as part of Lancashire County Council budget cuts.

=== St Annes ===
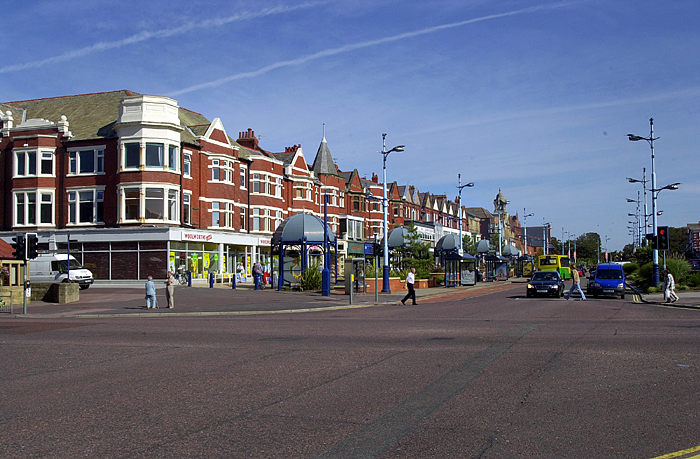
St Annes Square, 2006

St Annes-on-the-Sea (also known as St Annes-on-Sea or St Annes) was a 19th-century planned town. St Anne's Church was built as a chapel of ease in 1873, and St Annes-on-the-Sea railway station opened in the same year. An official founding ceremony for the town was held on 31 March 1875, when the cornerstone of the St Anne's Hotel was laid. The town was developed from 1875 after Thomas Fair, agent to the Clifton Estate, sold leases to the St Anne's on the Sea Land and Building Company. Plans for the town were laid out by the Bury firm of architects Maxwell and Tuke who later went on to construct Blackpool Tower. There was an open-air seawater swimming pool from 1916 until the mid-1980s.

St Annes is the original home of Premium Bonds and their prize-selecting computer ERNIE, which were on a site between Shepherd Road and Heyhouses Lane. Premium Bonds operated from there for more than 40 years before moving to Blackpool. The shopping area declined towards the end of the 20th century and was redeveloped in an attempt to attract more retailers and shoppers. As part of this project, a restaurant quarter was established, centred around Wood Street. The work included a £2m restoration of Ashton Gardens, a park near the town centre, in 2009.

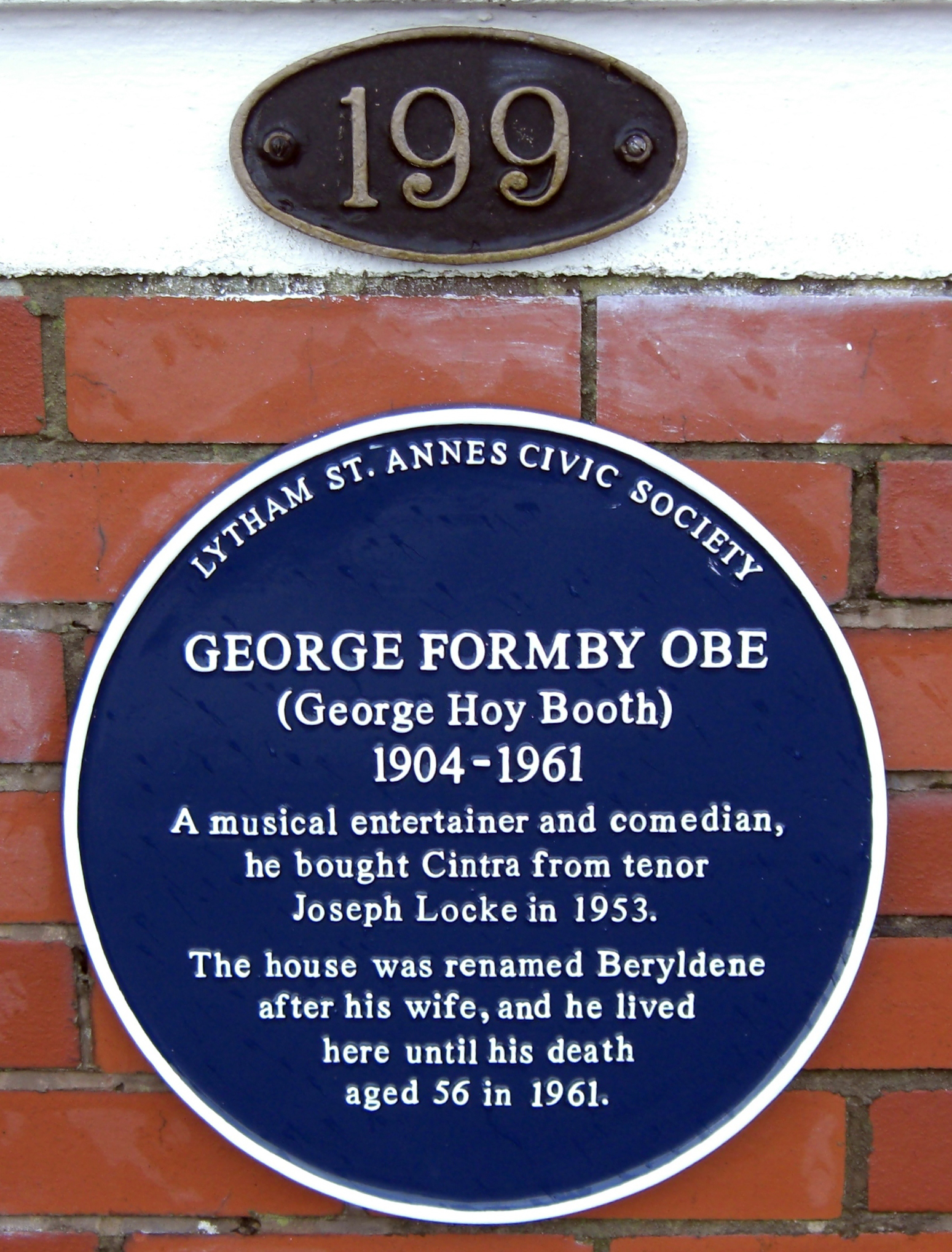
Blue plaque at George Formby's house "Beryldene", Inner Promenade

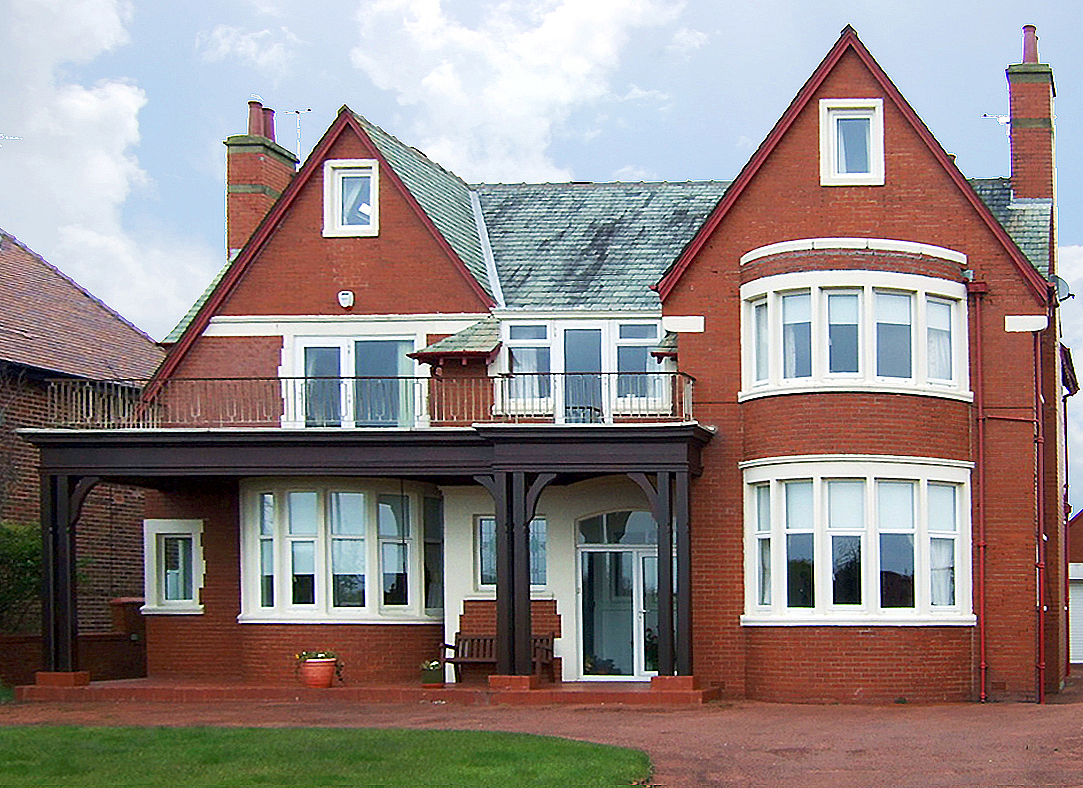
George Formby's house

The beach to the north of St Annes Pier was an internationally renowned sand yachting venue for many years, but this activity has been suspended since 2002 when a visitor to the beach died after being hit by a sand yacht. St Annes Beach hosts a number of kite flying events each year. In 2006 kite enthusiasts raised concerns about the future of these activities following a decision by Fylde Borough Council in 2006 to ban the flying of kites with two or more lines anywhere in the Fylde. Following representations from kite-fliers and completion of a risk assessment, the council rescinded the ban on condition that kite fliers remain at least 50m from the sand dunes.

A memorial statue of a lifeboatman looking out to sea was placed on the promenade at St Anne's after the Mexico Disaster of 1886. The original lifeboat station was established in 1881 but closed in 1925 due to silting of the channel (a secondary channel of the Ribble that ran past the pier). A lifeboat continued to operate from Lytham, but the main channel of the river also became silted up, so in 2000 the lifeboat was moved to a new all-weather RNLI base a few hundred yards south of St Annes Pier. St Annes-on-the-Sea Carnegie Library is just outside the town centre in an Edwardian, Carnegie-funded building.

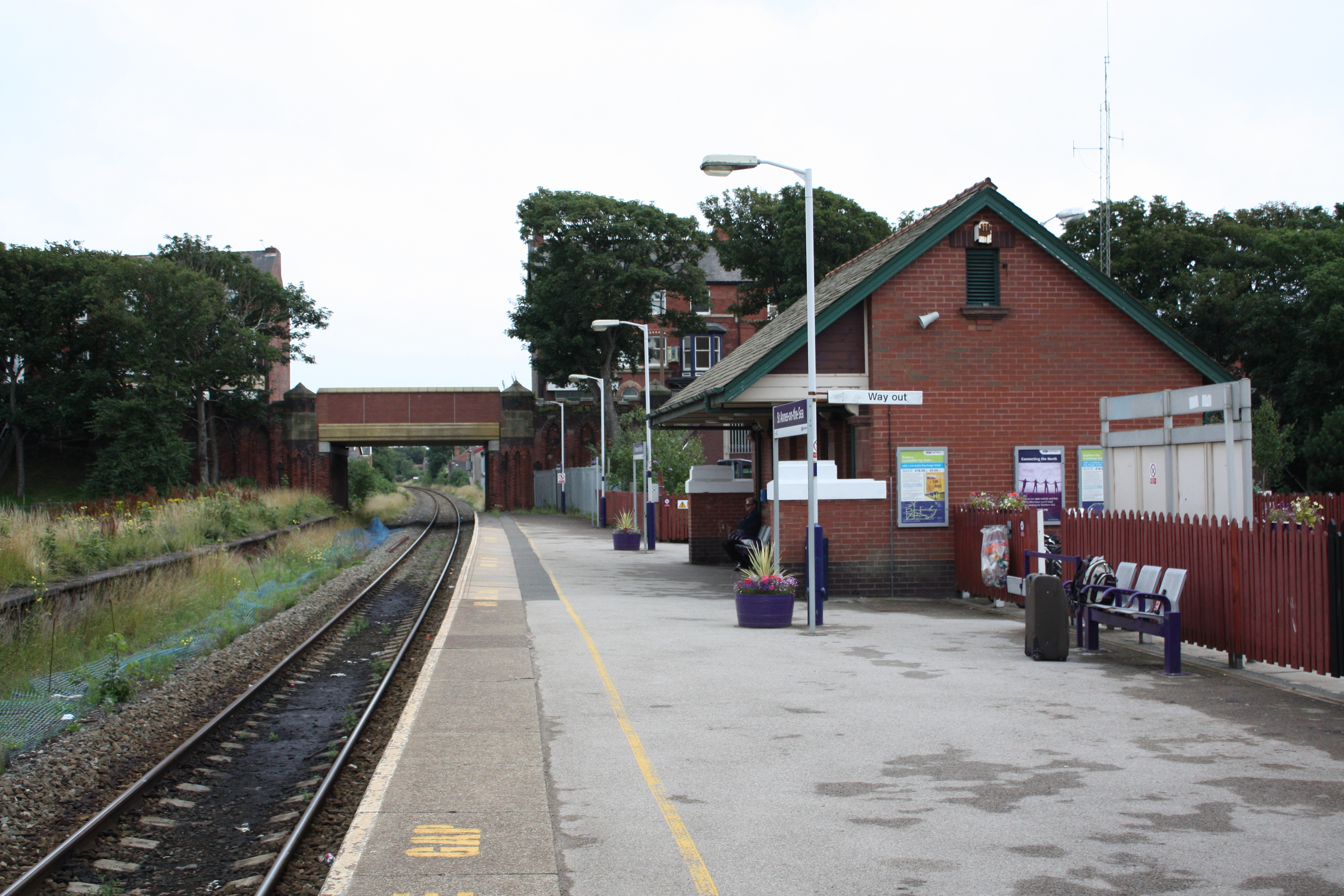
St Annes railway station

The town's flag

There is some confusion, even among residents of the town, about whether the correct name is "St Annes" or "St Anne's". The apostrophe has been dropped from the name by many residents and has long been absent in many formal uses, such as the Lytham St Annes Express newspaper, St Annes Parish Church, and Lytham St Annes High School, although the spelling St. Anne's is still sometimes used. The area takes its name from St Annes Parish Church.

In October 2008, a bronze statue by sculptor Graham Ibbeson of comedian Les Dawson, who lived in the town, was unveiled by Dawson's widow and daughter in the ornamental gardens next to St Annes Pier. Entertainer George Formby also lived in the town, and there is a plaque outside the house where he lived from 1953 until his death in 1961.

=== Ansdell ===
Ansdell is a small district between Lytham and St Annes, on the landward side of the railway line, served by Ansdell and Fairhaven railway station; it also has the Ansdell Institute club and a public library. It is named after Richard Ansdell (1815–1885), an artist who lived in the area and painted numerous oils depicting hunting scenes. Ansdell enjoys the distinction of being the only place in England to be named after an artist.

Ansdell hosts the largest school in Lancashire, Lytham St Annes High School, with around 1,500 students. Ansdell also encompasses the southern end of Royal Lytham & St Annes Golf Club. Ansdell is also the home of Fylde Rugby Club, established in May 1920, later to be closed during the war effort, and reopened in 1946. The club has reared many eminent players, notably Malcolm Phillips (a former President of the club) and Bill Beaumont.

=== Fairhaven ===
Lytham St Annes

Fairhaven is the district between Lytham and St Annes on the coastal side of the railway. It has been suggested it is named after Thomas Fair, the land agent for the Clifton estate. It is believed by other researchers that Thomas Riley named his Master Plan for Fairhaven after a biblical passage, Acts 27 verse 8, referring to Paul the Apostle's journey to Rome; many of the road names are connected to Paul and his journey.

Its main claim to fame is an artificial lake, known as Fairhaven Lake. In 1923, the new borough of Lytham St Annes was formed and subsequently purchased the lake with money quietly donated by Lord Ashton. In recognition of this, after extensive landscaping designed by T H Mawson, the lake was formally re-opened in 1926 and named Ashton Marine Park. After continuing confusion with Ashton Park in St Annes, the name reverted to Fairhaven Lake in 1974. It is an important wildfowl habitat.

Its other famous landmark is the Fairhaven United Reformed Church, which is of unusual design, being built in Byzantine style and faced with glazed white tiles, and commonly known as the White Church. Fairhaven contains the former King Edward VII and Queen Mary School, which has now merged with Arnold School of Blackpool to become AKS Lytham.

The sands and tidal mudflats of the area (the mouth of the River Ribble) are an important feeding area for wintering waders. The RSPB operate a visitor centre from Fairhaven Lake to provide information and guided walks. The lake has been flooded by the sea in the distant past but is now protected by a substantial sea defence wall.

Fairhaven occupies an area of former sand dunes previously known as Starr Hills, which extended as far as St Annes town centre along the southern side of the railway. The name is still used for a residential home named after the eponymous residence constructed in the 1860s for Richard Ansdell, which was transformed into a hospital during World War I, before assuming its present use. The Fairhaven Estate was first laid out in 1892. Beginning in 1895, the estate was divided into parcels of land which could be purchased or leased for residential development.

== History ==
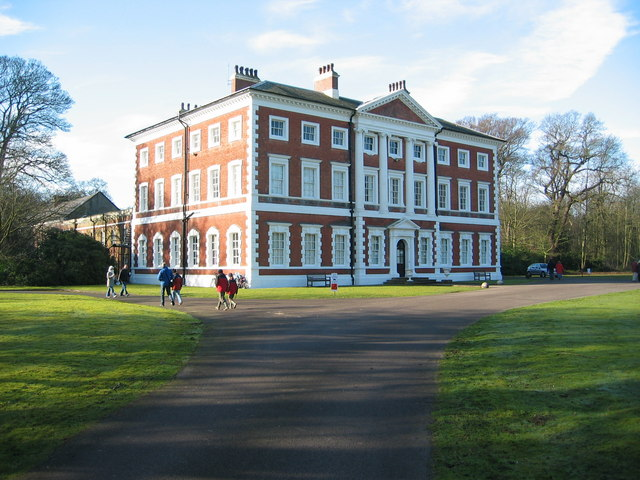
Lytham Hall

The area is known to have been populated during the Bronze Age and scattered hamlets have existed there ever since, including a village called Kilgrimol or Kilgrimhow; this is believed to have been founded in around 900 AD by Vikings expelled from Dublin. The area including the Fylde was known in Anglo-Saxon and medieval times as Amounderness. Lytham is mentioned in the Domesday Book as Lidun. In 1199, Richard Fitzroger gave his Lytham estates (then known as Lethun) to the Benedictine monks of Durham. The monks established a priory (although it was really too small to be called that as it comprised three or four monks only) on the site of the present Lytham Hall. The priory existed until 1539; in 1540, the monastery at Durham was dissolved and the Crown became Lord of the Manor.

The manor of Lytham passed through several owners when, in 1606, it was sold to Cuthbert Clifton for £4,300. Clifton enlarged the manor house and made it the family seat. The house was replaced in 1757 with the present Lytham Hall, designed by architect John Carr of York. At this time St Annes did not exist, but Lytham was large enough to be called a town, with its own promenade and a reputation as a resort.

Northwards along the coast from Lytham, within the Clifton estates, were mostly sand dunes. The only habitations were the tiny hamlet of Heyhouses and the rural Trawl Boat Inn; a name resurrected in recent times for a public house in Wood Street in St Annes, opened by Wetherspoons. In 1873, the Cliftons built a Chapel of Ease dedicated to St Anne in this area, to encourage better religious observance, as most inhabitants found the long journey to St Cuthbert's in Lytham too onerous; this became the parish church of St. Anne's. At the time it was built the church had no tower. On 14 October 1874, the St Anne's-on-the-Sea Land and Building Company Ltd was registered, mainly at the instigation of Elijah Hargreaves, a wealthy Lancashire mill owner from Rawtenstall, whose intention was to develop the area as a resort.

The land of St Annes was leased from the Clifton estate for 999 years, although the lease still gave the Cliftons the right to kill game on the land for this period. Building rapidly commenced with the St Anne's Hotel (built in 1875, since demolished), the Hydro Terrace, which later became St Annes Square, and the railway station being among the first buildings. A separate company was formed to finance the construction of the pier, which was opened on 15 June 1885. At that time the main channel of the River Ribble ran by the end of the pier, and boats would bring people in from Lytham and Southport. The Ribble Navigation and Preston Dock Act 1883 (46 & 47 Vict. c. cxv), which came into force in 1889, was intended to stabilise the often silted River Ribble to allow a steady trade into Preston docks. However, this work moved the main channel much further out and left St Annes Pier on flat sandbanks, where no ships could dock. In June 1910 the Floral Hall was opened at the end of the pier. It was a popular attraction and stars including Gracie Fields, Leslie Henson and Claude Hulbert performed there. Lytham and St Annes were consolidated in 1922. In 1974, a major fire seriously damaged the hall; it was restored to some extent, but ended up being used as a skatepark (skateboards) before another fire in July 1982 destroyed it. About half of the pier was then demolished to make the beach safe to use.

The Lytham St Annes Civic Society operates a local blue plaque scheme. These commemorate historic buildings and residents, including Sir John Alcock and George Formby.

The 2012 Olympic torch relay passed through St Annes, Fairhaven and Lytham before continuing onto nearby Warton and Freckleton.

== Governance ==
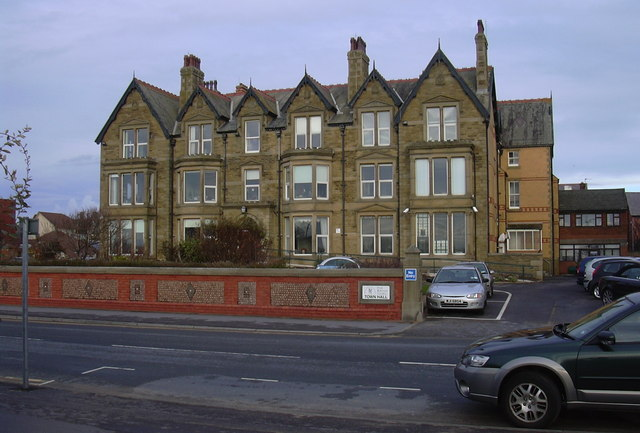
Lytham St Annes Town Hall on the South Promenade, a former hotel which became the town hall in 1922

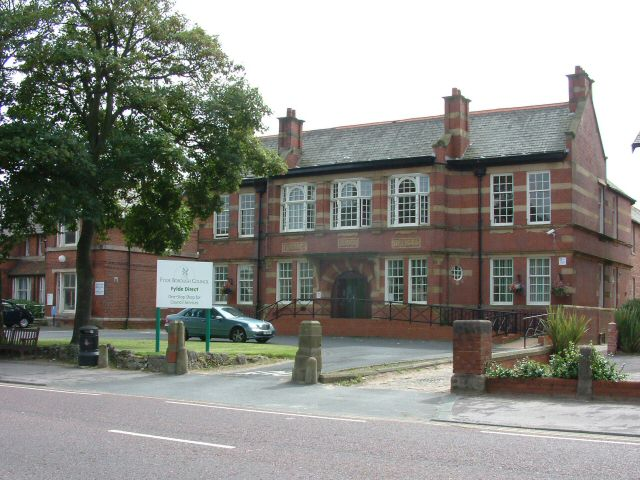
St Anne's Public Offices was the town hall until 1922

There are two tiers of local government covering all of Lytham St Annes, at district and county level: Fylde Borough Council and Lancashire County Council. Fylde Borough Council has its headquarters at Lytham St Annes Town Hall on South Promenade in St Annes.

St Annes has a third tier of local government, a civil parish formally called Saint Anne's on the Sea, which covers the western part of Lytham St Annes the built-up area. The parish council has elected to style itself St Anne's on the Sea Town Council; it is based at West Lodge in Ashton Gardens on St George's Road. The remainder of Lytham St Annes is an unparished area.

=== History of local government ===
Lytham had anciently been a chapelry in the parish of Kirkham, but became a separate parish in the Middle Ages. The ancient parish covered most of the area of the modern Lytham St Annes. Improvement commissioners were established in 1847 to govern the eastern part of the parish, including the settlement of Lytham itself. The ancient parish of Lytham became a civil parish in 1866, but in 1878 St Annes was made a Local board of health district, called "Saint Anne's-on-the-Sea". Both the Lytham commissioners' district and the St Anne's local board of health district were reconstituted as urban districts in 1894, at which point St Annes was created a separate civil parish.

St Anne's-on-the-Sea Urban District Council built itself St Anne's Public Offices in Clifton Drive in 1902 to serve as its headquarters. In 1922, the two urban districts merged to form a municipal borough and civil parish called Lytham St Annes; the civil parishes of Lytham and St Annes on the Sea were abolished.

Since the reorganisation of local government in 1974, the town has been administered by Fylde District Council. In 2005 St Annes on the Sea was made a new civil parish, covering roughly the area of the civil parish which existed from 1894 to 1924.

== Transport ==
=== Railway ===
Railway station
Disused railway station

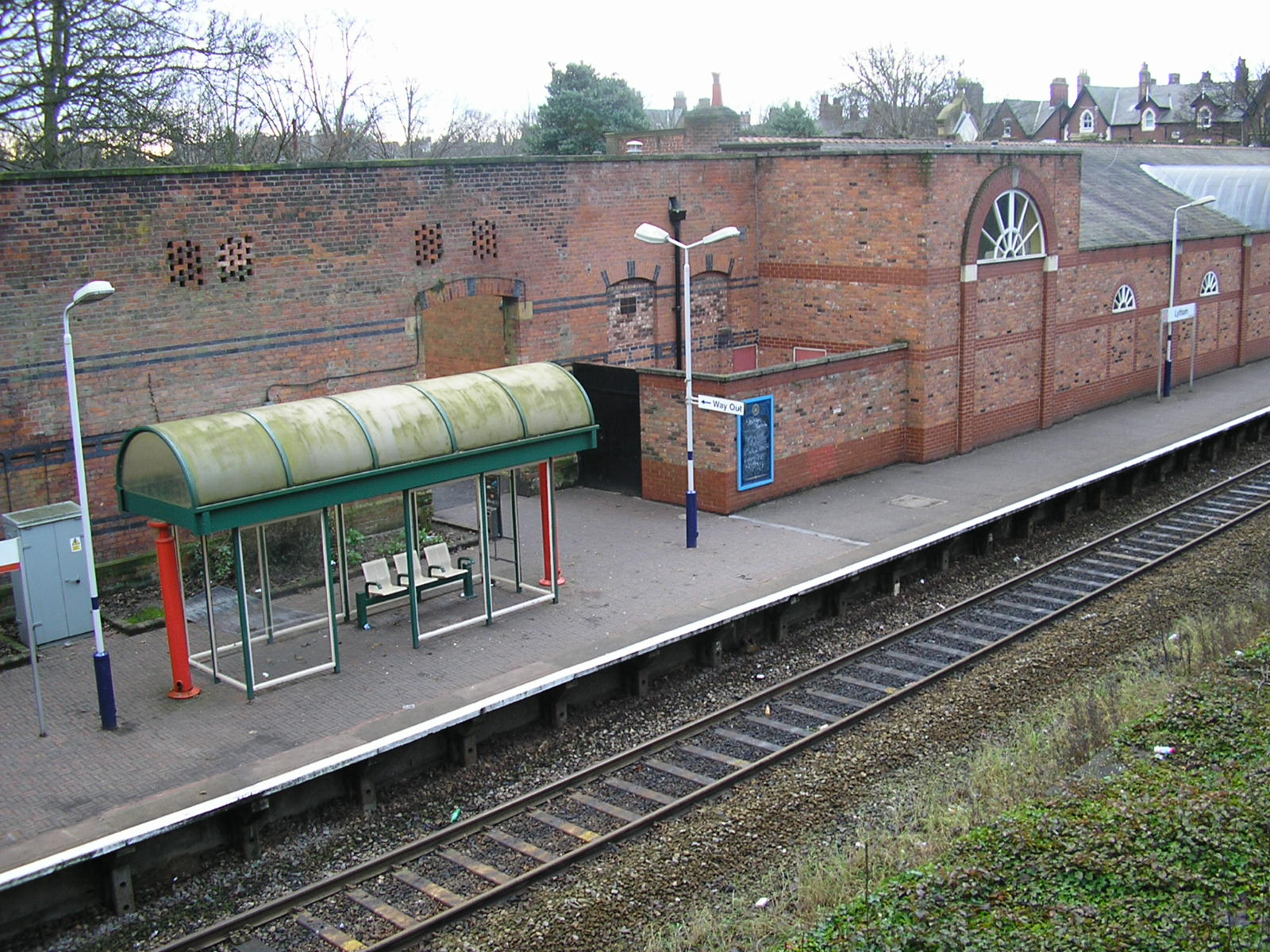
Lytham railway station

The borough has three railway stations: Lytham, St Annes-on-the-Sea and Ansdell & Fairhaven. Northern Trains provides hourly services on the single-tracked southern branch of the Blackpool Branch Lines between Blackpool South and Preston.

Prior to the closure of Blackpool Central in 1964, the Coast Road, as it was known, was the main line into Blackpool, although Lytham St. Annes' stations were bypassed by the direct line from Kirkham and Wesham to Blackpool North.

Previously there were stations at Station Road, Lytham (1846–1874) and Gillett's Crossing Halt, near the Old Links golf course on St Annes (1913–1949).

=== Buses ===
Services are operated predominantly by the following companies:

- Blackpool Transport operates services to Blackpool
- Stagecoach Merseyside & South Lancashire runs routes to Preston
- Archway Travel operates services to Blackpool and Great Eccleston.

=== Roads ===
The area is connected to Blackpool on the coastal A584 and the B5261. The B5410 links the borough with the M55 motorway to Preston and the M6. Lytham town centre has limited parking for the disabled; other car parks lie outside of the immediate town centre.

== Local issues ==
=== Lowther Pavilion Lytham ===
In 2008, local residents became aware that Fylde Borough Council was struggling financially; in particular, it was becoming unable to subsidise local amenities and the closure of St. Annes swimming pool demonstrated how serious the situation was. It was felt that a group needed to take immediate action if they wished to reduce the subsidy from the council and ensure that Lowther Pavilion, the only purpose-built theatre in the area, remained open. In November 2008, Friends of Lowther Pavilion was formed, with the stated purposes of reducing the subsidy required from the council; securing the future of Lowther Pavilion, raising money for improvements, and ultimately generate profits; involving the local community in the running of the theatre and making it part of the town; and becoming the basis of a networking forum for the participating groups.

=== Closure of public facilities ===
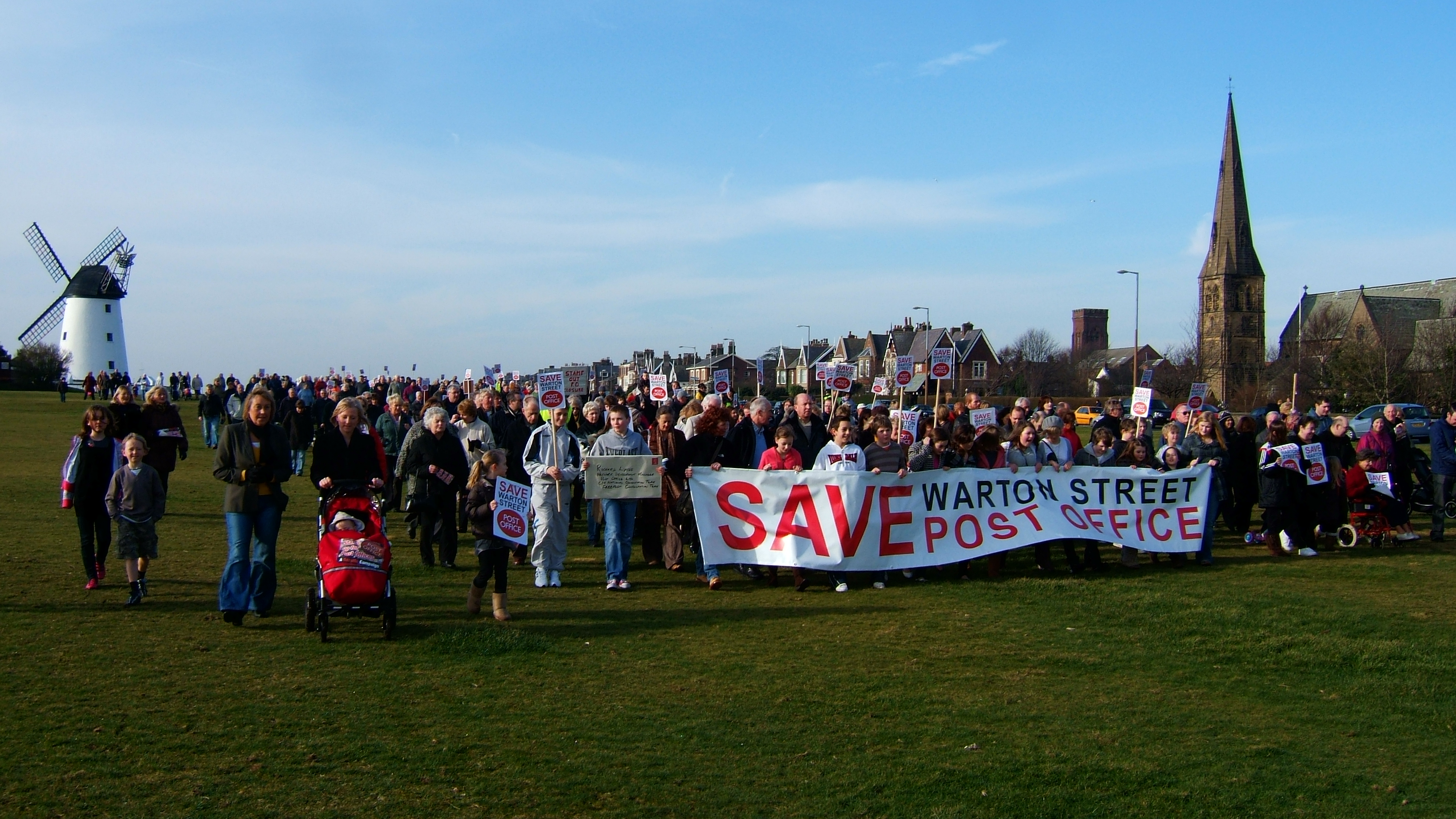
A Save Warton Street Post Office march across Lytham Green, February 2008

In 2008, Fylde Borough Council announced that the borough's two public swimming pools, in Kirkham and St Annes, would be closed. Public campaigns were started to oppose both closures and they reopened in 2010, under management by Fylde Coast YMCA, with financial support from the council.

=== Property developments ===
As of 2007 the most controversial political issue in Lytham St Annes concerned property development. No more greenfield sites were available and developers were seeking to replace existing buildings or to build on open spaces such as Ashton Gardens in St Annes. Many historic buildings had been demolished and replaced with larger modern constructions of standard design as can be found in many other places. For example, the art deco former headquarters of the Football League was demolished and replaced with a block of flats.

In 2005, a property development company submitted a proposal for a 2,800 apartment development called Lytham Quays to be built on industrial brownfield sites in the east of the town. The developer, Kensington Developments, claimed in a 2008 article in the Daily Telegraph that "In truth, the majority of people were for it".

== Healthcare ==
Primary care is the responsibility of NHS North Lancashire Primary Care Trust.

There have been a number of recent reorganisations and building for general practice in the area. General practice in Lytham is based at Lytham Primary Care Centre, opened in 2009; this building is on the site of the original Lytham Hospital. Two practices are housed in this building: Holland House Surgery and Fernbank Surgery.

Secondary care is mainly provided by the Blackpool, Fylde and Wyre Hospitals NHS Foundation Trust; its nearest hospital is Blackpool Victoria Hospital.

== Religion ==
=== Lytham ===
- Lytham Methodist Church, Park Street; opened in September 1868
- St Cuthbert's (Church of England), Church Road; built in 1834.
- St John the Divine Church (Church of England), East Beach; built 1848–49 by Edwin Hugh Shellard.
- St Peter's Roman Catholic Church, Clifton Street; built 1838, the tower was added in 1878.
- Lytham Christian Centre, Preston Road.
- Lytham United Reformed Church, Bannister Street; founded 1863.

=== St Annes ===
- Church Road Methodist Church, Church Road.
- St Anne's Church, Church of England parish church, Oxford Road – built in 1873 by Paley and Austin. The tower was added in 1887.
- St Annes Baptist Church, St.Andrews Road South – opened on Christmas Day 1886.
- St Annes on Sea United Reformed Church, Clifton Drive – built by W.J. Porritt from 1880 onwards.
- St Annes Hebrew Congregation, Orchard Road.
- Our Lady Star of the Sea Church, Roman Catholic church, St Annes Road East, built in 1890 by Pugin & Pugin.
- St Thomas' Church, St Thomas Road – built in 1899 by Austin and Paley.
- Fylde Christian Service Church, St.Andrews Road South – based in the former St Annes Baptist chapel.
- St Margaret of Antioch, St.Leonards Road West – founded in 1925.
- St Alban RC Church, Kilnhouse Lane – founded in 1964.
- St. Gregory's Eastern Orthodox Chapel, Orchard Road – established in 2017.

=== Ansdell and Fairhaven ===
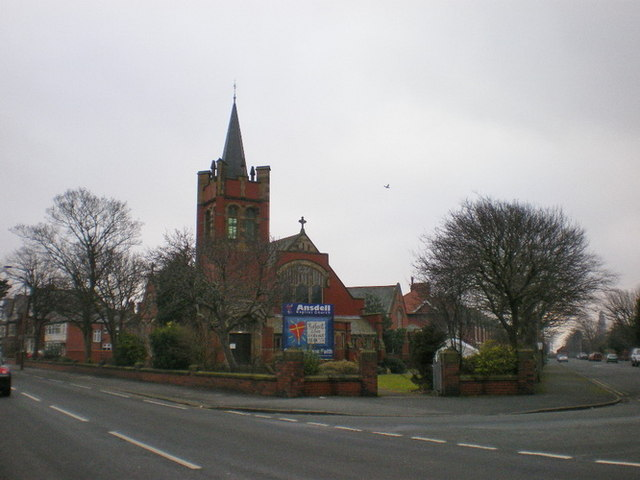
Ansdell Baptist Church

- The Well Church, Ansdell Road North; founded 1908.
- Ansdell Unitarian & Free Christian Church, Channing Road; opened 1930, new hall added 1968.
- St Joseph's RC Church, Woodlands Road; opened 20 September 1914; built 1909 by Pugin & Pugin.
- Fairhaven United Reformed Church, Clifton Drive South; opened 17 October 1912; built by Briggs, Wolstenholme & Thornley; known locally as the "White Church".
- St Paul's CofE Church, Clifton Drive; built 1902 by Medland Taylor.
- Fairhaven Methodist Church, Clifton Drive; founded 1909.

== Wildlife ==
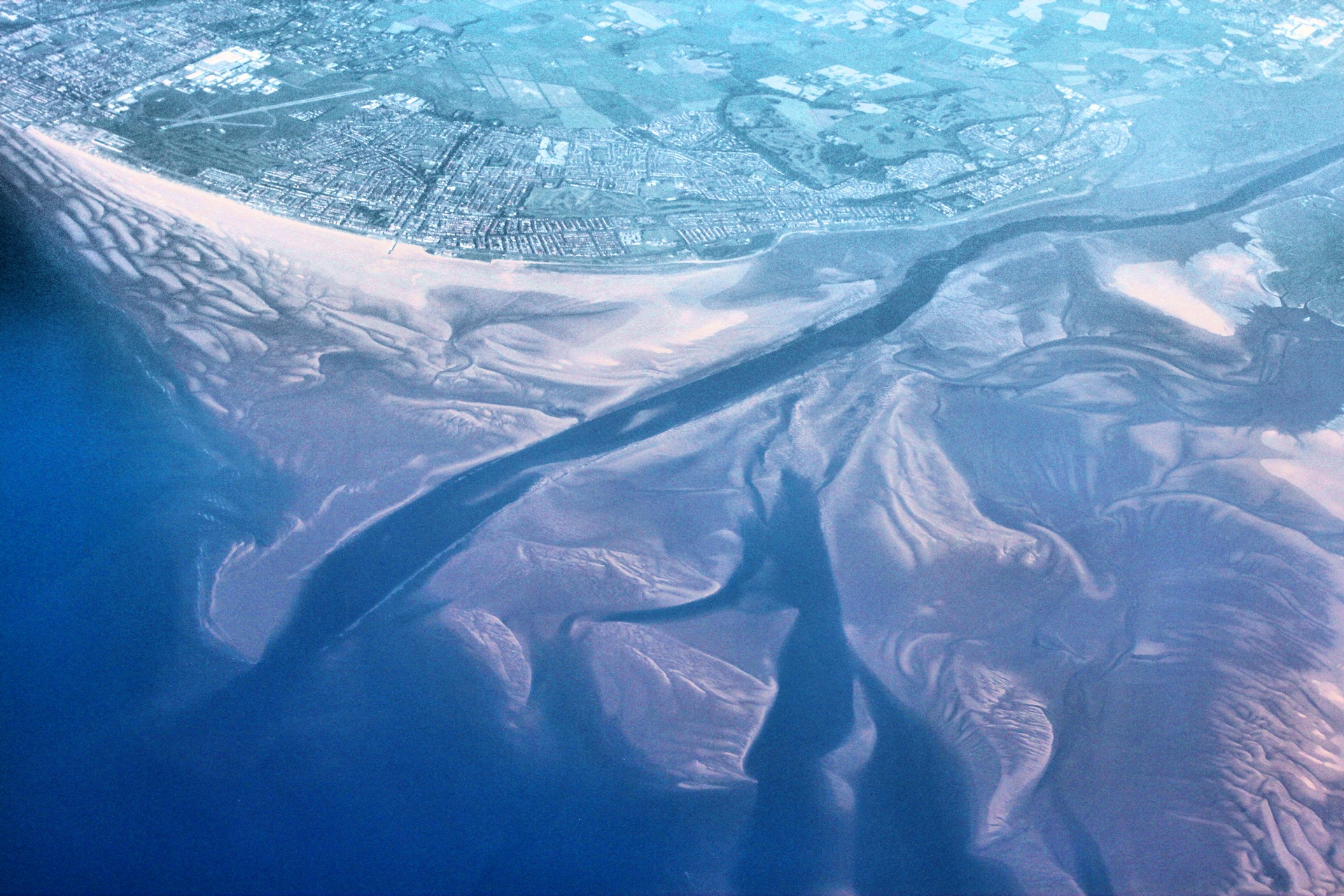
Ribble estuary with Lytham St Annes

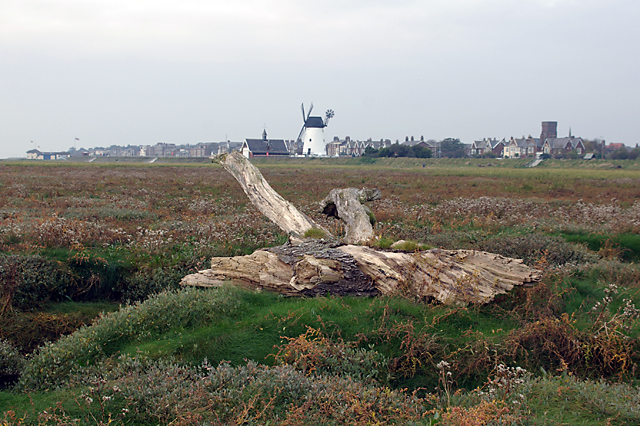
Salt marsh on the Ribble estuary

The Ribble Estuary and sands of St Annes and Lytham are an Important Bird Area, mainly as a feeding ground for waders during winter and spring. There are flocks of thousands of red knot, dunlin, sanderling, bar-tailed godwit and other waders; over 100,000 birds winter there. Flocks of pink-footed geese are commonly seen in winter as they fly over St Annes between their feeding grounds around Southport and Over Wyre. Many pintail and other ducks feed and rest in the estuary.

There are 80 hectares of sand dune habitat on the coast of Lytham St Annes which is home to a wide variety of rare and interesting plants and wildlife communities. The Lytham St Annes Nature Reserve has around 250 different plant species include internationally rare plants not found outside the UK. Common lizards are found across the dune system and it is an important habitat for various breeding birds including European stonechat, skylark, linnet and reed bunting. The grayling butterfly, which is a coastal specialist, is also found on the dunes.

The Witchwood is a narrow strip of woodland protected by a tree preservation order and partly a Site of Special Scientific Interest. The strip, which runs alongside the railway line, between Blackpool Road to Ballam Road, was originally part of Lytham Hall parkland and was created by Lytham St. Annes Civic Society. A limited company was established to manage the wood and society members cleared the site and introduced a path. On advice from the Forestry Commission, invasive sycamore and elm are being replaced by indigenous English species. The walk was officially opened in 1974 by Prince Philip, Duke of Edinburgh and is a haven for wildlife.

== Culture ==
=== Art and architecture ===
The following organisations are currently active:

- Lytham St Annes Art Society (founded 1912)
- Lytham St Annes Civic Society (founded c. 1955)
- Lytham Heritage Group
- Friends of the Lytham St Annes Art Collection
- Friends of Lytham Hall
- Fylde Arts Association
- Fylde Decorative and Fine Arts Society (Fylde DFAS).

A series of public artworks were commissioned as improvement works to The Square for Saint-Annes-on-the-Sea including a mosaic by artist Gary Drostle in 2005.

=== Music and entertainment ===
Notable musicians, actors and entertainers who were born or live(d) in Lytham St Annes include entertainer George Formby; comedians Les Dawson, Bobby Ball, Roy Walker and Jenny Eclair; actors Stephen Tompkinson, Jonas Armstrong, Ian Anderson, Dean Lennox Kelly and Craig Kelly; composer Peter Dickinson; and guitarist Mario Parga.

=== Festivals ===
==== Beer Festival ====
Lytham Beer Festival has been held annually in September since 2007, although this was moved to October in 2012. It is organised by the Blackpool, Fylde and Wyre branch of CAMRA and offers a choice of around 90 real ales as well as a selection of ciders and foreign bottled beers.

==== Lytham Festival ====
Lytham Green sees an annual five-day musical festival branded as the Lytham Festival and operated by Cuffe & Taylor, part of Live Nation UK. Live performances on the promenade first began under the name "Lytham Proms" in 1999. In 2009, Daniel Cuffe and Peter Taylor took over operation of festivals on the green with a one-night concert by English soprano singer Lesley Garrett. The festival has since seen a variety of leading bands and musicians including The Human League, Madness, Nile Rodgers & Chic, The Human League, Kylie Minogue, Rod Stewart, Diana Ross, The Human League, Duran Duran and Tears for Fears.

== Media ==
Local television news programmes are provided by BBC North West and ITV Granada. The local television station That's Lancashire also broadcasts to the area. Television signals are received from the Winter Hill TV transmitter.

Local radio stations are BBC Radio Lancashire, Heart North West, Smooth North West, Greatest Hits Radio Lancashire, Dune Radio and Coastal Radio (broadcasting from Blackpool) and Sands Radio, a community-based station which has studios in town.

The town has a local newspaper, the Lytham St Annes Express and is within the circulation area of the Blackpool Gazette.

== Sport ==
=== Golf ===
The Royal Lytham & St Annes Golf Club was founded in March 1886 and moved to its present site in 1926. Many world tournaments have been, and are, played there, including the Ryder Cup, the Open Championship and the Dunlop Masters.

Lytham Green Drive Golf Club was founded in 1913 and has hosted qualifying matches for Open Championship. The clubhouse is on Ballam Road.

There are two other golf clubs in the area, which have all hosted qualifying for The Open Championship. They are Fairhaven Golf Club and perhaps the most well known, St Annes Old Links Golf Club, which has also hosted many other top events in the golfing calendar. The Old Links course runs northwards from Highbury Road on the landward side of the railway line.

=== Rugby ===
Fylde Rugby Club competes in National League 1 and play at the Woodlands Memorial Ground; this is shared with Blackpool Rugby League Club, which competes in National League Two. Amongst their notable former players are two British and Irish Lions, Brian Ashton and Bill Beaumont.

=== Football ===
The headquarters of the English Football League were in the former Sandown Hotel, in Clifton Drive in St Annes, between 1959 and 2017.

=== Cricket and hockey ===
St Annes Cricket Club are based at Vernon Road. England and Lancashire cricketer Andrew Flintoff played for St Annes, starting as a 12-year-old in 1989.

Lytham Cricket and Sports Club is based in Church Road; it is the home of Lytham St Annes Hockey Club.

=== Cycling ===
The second stage of the Tour of Britain Women's cycle race passed through Lytham in 2026.

== Twin towns ==
Lytham St Annes is twinned with:

- Werne, Germany
- Caudry, France.

== Notable people ==
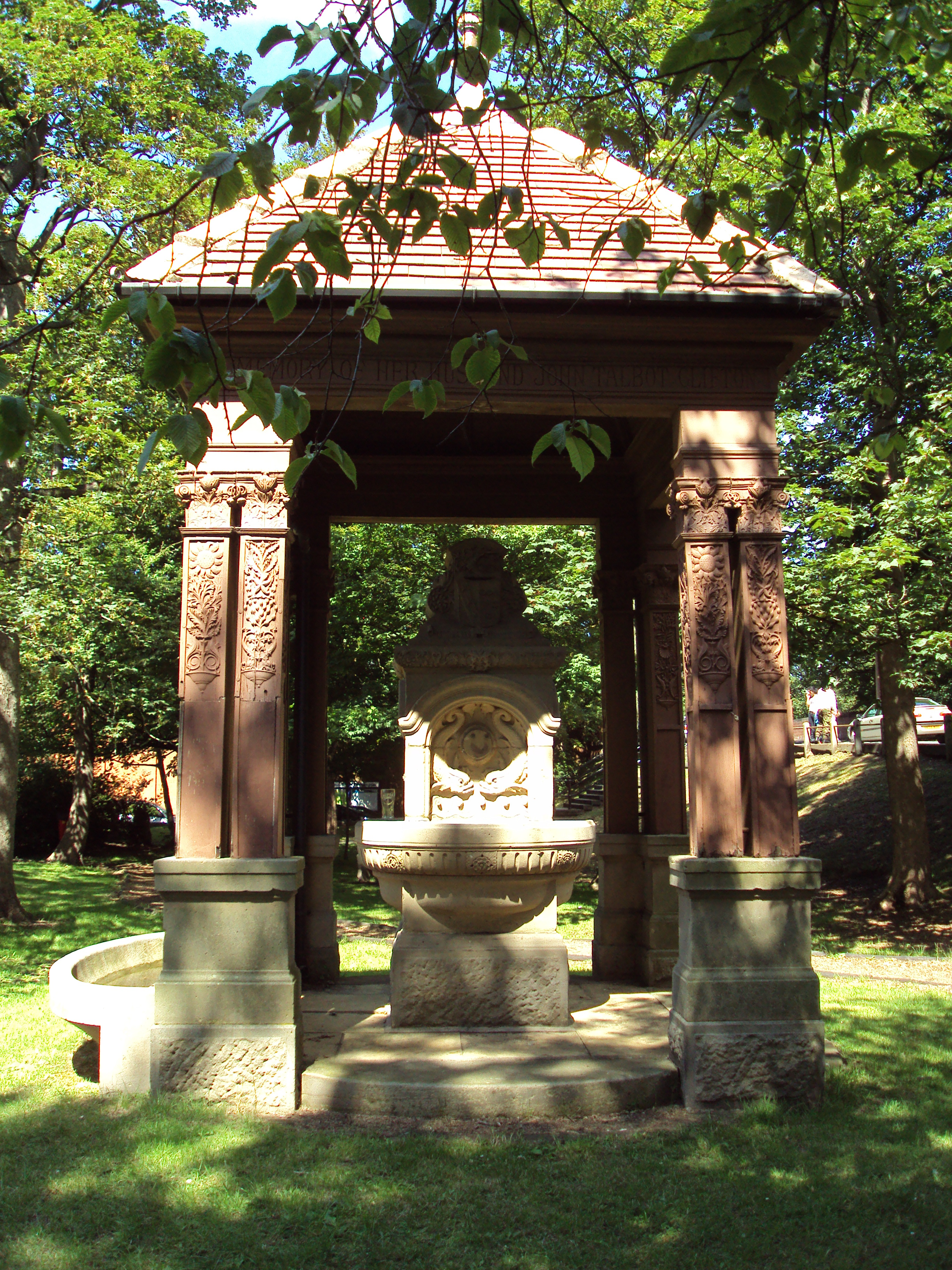
Memorial fountain for John Talbot Clifton MP

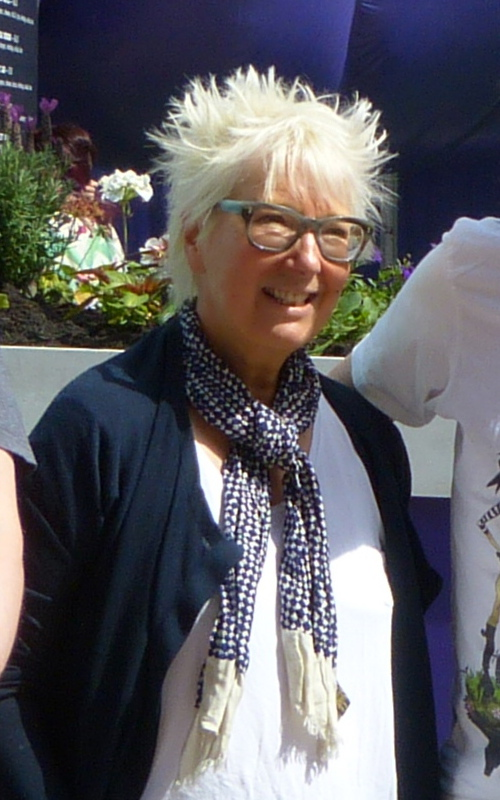
Jenny Eclair, 2016

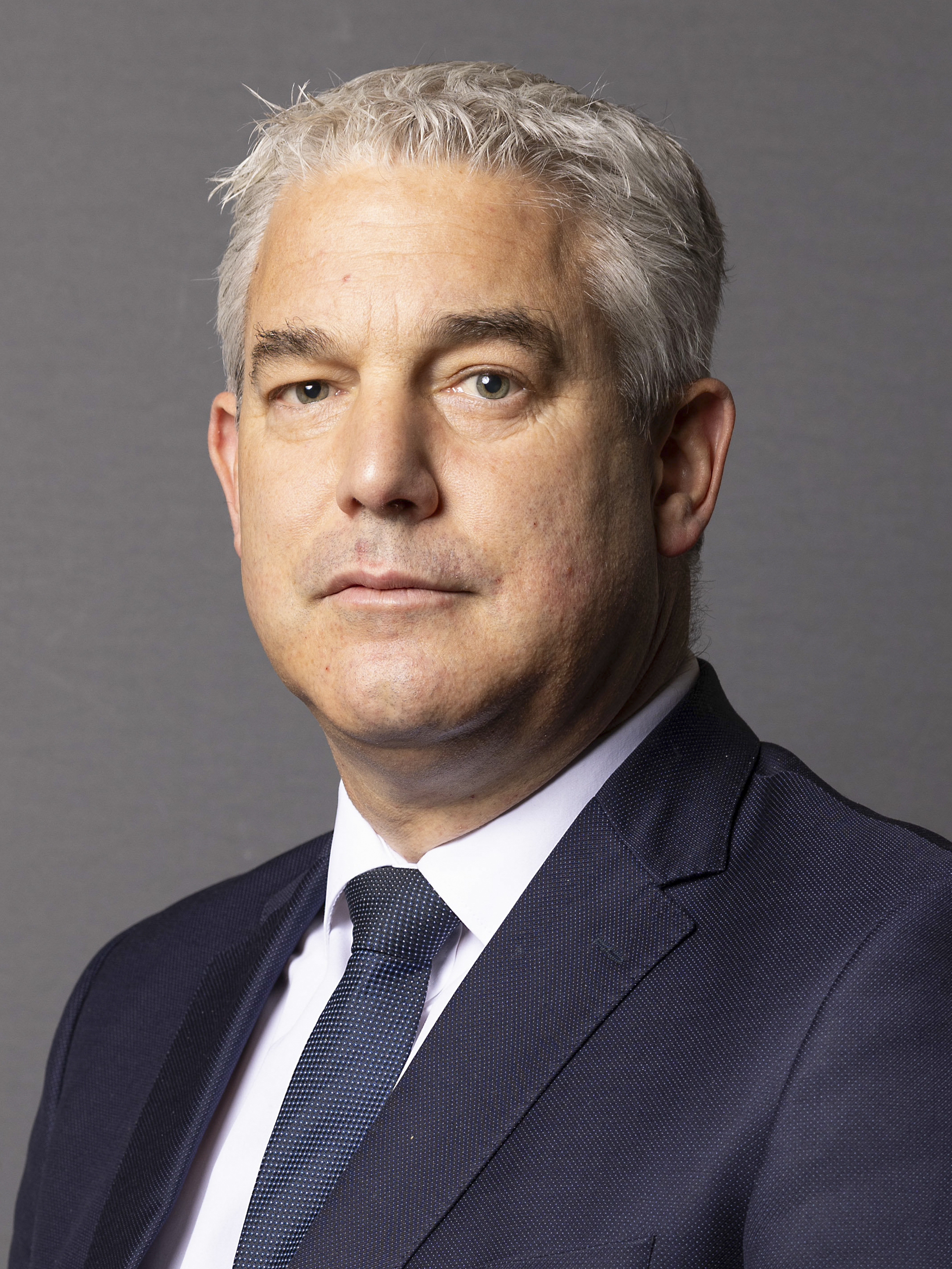
Steve Barclay, 2023

- William Stanley (ca.1435–1495), an English soldier and younger brother of Thomas Stanley, 1st Earl of Derby.
- Richard Ansdell (1815–1885), a British painter of animals and genre scenes, had a local "summer house".
- John Talbot Clifton (1819–1882) of Lytham Hall, MP for North Lancashire, 1844–1847
- John Talbot Clifton (1868–1928) of Lytham Hall, grandson of his namesake, landowner and traveller.
- Violet Clifton (1883–1961) of Lytham Hall, traveller and writer
- George Formby (1904–1961), actor, singer-songwriter and comedian, owned a local house
- Peter Dickinson (1934–2023), an English composer, musicologist, author and pianist.
- Robin Butler, Baron Butler of Brockwell (born 1938), retired civil servant, now House of Lords crossbencher.
- Ann Cryer (born 1939), former politician, was MP for Keighley and Ilkley, 1997 to 2010.
- Chris Davies (born 1954) MP for Littleborough and Saddleworth, 1995 to 1997 and MEP, 1999 to 2014
- Jenny Eclair (born 1960), comedian, novelist and actress; went to school locally
- Steve Barclay (born 1972), politician, MP for North East Cambridgeshire since 2010
- Holly Newman (born 1974), actress who played Lorraine Brownlow in Coronation Street.
- Lisa Smart (born ca.1978) politician, MP for Hazel Grove since 2024.

=== Sport ===
- Albert Cordingley (1871–1939), cricketer, played 15 first-class cricket matches, club professional for Lytham Cricket Club
- Elsie Corlett (1902–1988), amateur golfer, finallist in the Women's Amateur Championship in 1938
- Larry L'Estrange (1934–2007), born in Lytham, Irish rugby player and British soldier
- Martin Miller (born 1940), cricketer, played 12 first-class cricket games
- Fred Willder (born 1944), footballer who played 248 games for Fleetwood Town
- John Craven (1947–1996), footballer, played 360 games, including 163 for Blackpool
- David Stephenson (1958–2022), rugby union and rugby league footballer, played 370 rugby league games
- Steve Macauley (born 1969), footballer, who played over 300 games, including 261 for Crewe Alexandra
- David McNiven (born 1978), footballer, played about 300 games
- Scott McNiven (born 1978), Scottish footballer, played 475 games, including 222 for Oldham Athletic
- Joe Anyon (born 1986), a football goalkeeper, played 240 games.

== See also ==
- Listed buildings in Lytham
- Listed buildings in Saint Anne's on the Sea
