= List of libraries in the United Kingdom =

This is a list of libraries in the United Kingdom.

== England (by region) ==
As of 2011, there were approximately 3,500 public libraries throughout England, along with hundreds of other libraries including academic and research libraries.

=== East of England ===
Cambridge

- Cambridge Central Library
- Tyndale House (Cambridge)
- University of Cambridge: see: Libraries of the University of Cambridge

Norwich

- Library of Sir Thomas Browne, Norwich, 17th c.
- Norfolk and Norwich Law Library
- Norfolk and Norwich Millennium Library

Elsewhere

- Corn Exchange, Manningtree, Essex
- The Forum Southend-on-Sea, Essex
- Holst Library, Snape, Suffolk
- Ipswich County Library
- Ipswich Town Library
- University of Essex Library & Cultural Services, Colchester

=== East Midlands ===
Lincoln

- Lincoln Cathedral Library
- St. Martin's Parochial Library, Lincoln
- University of Lincoln Great Central Warehouse University Library

Nottingham

- Bromley House Library, Nottingham
- Literary and Philosophical Society library, Nottingham
- Nottingham Central Library
- Nottingham Mechanics' Institution Library
- University of Nottingham Sir Harry and Lady Djanogly Learning Resource Centre

Elsewhere

- British Cave Research Association library, Derbyshire
- Derby Central Library
- Francis Trigge Chained Library, Grantham
- Kettering Library, Northamptonshire
- Loughborough Library, Leicestershire
- Loughborough University Pilkington Library
- Mansfield Central Library, Nottinghamshire
- University of Leicester
  - Stanley Burton Centre for Holocaust Studies library

=== London ===
See: Libraries in London and List of libraries in the London Borough of Barnet

=== North East ===
Durham

- Durham Dean and Chapter Library
- Durham University
  - Cosin's Library, Durham
  - Durham University Library

Newcastle

- Elswick Mechanics' Institute library
- Jesmond Library, Newcastle
- Literary and Philosophical Society of Newcastle upon Tyne library
- Newcastle City Library
- Newcastle University Library

Elsewhere

- The Word (library), South Shields
- Sunderland Co-operative Library
- Sunderland Subscription Library
- Wallsend Co-operative Library
- Wolsingham Town Hall

=== North West ===
Liverpool

Manchester

- Chetham's Library, Manchester
- Instituto Cervantes, Manchester
- Manchester Free Library, est.1852
- Manchester Law Library
- Manchester Library & Information Service
  - Manchester Central Library
- Manchester Metropolitan University
  - North West Film Archive
- Portico Library, Manchester
- University of Manchester
  - Ahmed Iqbal Ullah Race Relations Resource Centre
  - John Rylands Research Institute and Library
  - University of Manchester Library

Elsewhere

- Accrington Library, Lancashire
- Armitt Library, Ambleside, Cumbria
- Barrow-in-Furness Main Public Library, Cumbria
- Birkenhead Central Library, Merseyside
- Bridgewater Library, Cheshire
- Bury Co-operative Society library, est.1896
- Carnegie Library, Runcorn, Cheshire
- Blackpool Central Library, Lancashire
- Chester Cathedral Library, Cheshire
- Clitheroe Library, Lancashire
- Darwen Library, Lancashire
- The Fielden Free Library, Fleetwood
- Harris Free Public Library, Preston, Lancashire
- Lancaster University
  - Lancaster University Library
  - The Ruskin, Lancaster
- Lytham Library, Lancashire
- Rawtenstall Library
- Rochdale Equitable Pioneers' Society library
- St Annes-on-the-Sea Carnegie Library, Lancashire
- Stockport Central Library, Greater Manchester
- Stonyhurst College libraries, Clitheroe
- Warrington Circulating Library, est.1760
- Warrington Perambulating Library, Cheshire, est.1858
- Working Class Movement Library, Salford, Greater Manchester

=== South East ===
Oxford

- Oxford Westgate Library
- University of Oxford: see: Libraries of the University of Oxford

Elsewhere

- Beaney House of Art and Knowledge, Canterbury, Kent
- Brighton and Hove: see: Libraries in Brighton and Hove
- Buckinghamshire County Libraries
- Catholic National Library, St Michael's Abbey, Farnborough, Hampshire
- Chatham Free Library
- Dartford Library
- Drill Hall Library, Chatham, Kent
- Kedermister Library, Langley, Berkshire
- Kent History and Library Centre, Maidstone
- Portsmouth Central Library
- Prince Consort's Library, Aldershot Military Town, Hampshire
- Reading Borough Libraries
  - Reading Central Library
- University of Reading library, Whiteknights
- University of Southampton Library

=== South West ===
Bristol

- Bristol Central Library
- Bristol University Library
- Trinity Road Library, Bristol

Exeter

- Devon and Exeter Institution, Exeter
- Exeter Cathedral Library
- Exeter University Library

Elsewhere

- Dodderidgian Library, Barnstaple, North Devon
- Gloucester Public Library
- Kresen Kernow, Cornwall
- Morrab Library, Penzance, Cornwall
- Passmore Edwards Centre, Newton Abbot, Devon
- Plymouth Athenaeum Library
- Royal Institution of Cornwall Courtney Library
- Science and Innovation Park library, Wroughton
- Watchet library, Somerset
- Wells Cathedral library, Somerset
- Wiltshire and Swindon History Centre, Chippenham
- Wiltshire Library and Information Service

=== West Midlands ===
Birmingham

Elsewhere

- Fenton Carnegie Library, Staffordshire
- Hereford Cathedral Library
- Lillington Library, Leamington Spa, Warwickshire
- Montagu C. Butler Library, Stoke-on-Trent, Staffordshire
- National Police Library, Ryton-on-Dunsmore, Warwickshire
- Redditch Library, Worcestershire
- Rugby library
- Shakespeare Institute, Stratford-upon-Avon
- Shrewsbury Library, Shropshire
- Stafford Borough Library, 1914–1998
- Thimblemill Library, Smethwick
- University of Warwick Library, Coventry
- Walsall Central Library
- Wedgwood Institute library, Burslem, Stoke-on-Trent, Staffordshire
- Willenhall Library
- William Salt Library, Stafford
- Worcester public library

=== Yorkshire and the Humber ===
Bradford

- Bradford Libraries
- Bradford Mechanics' Institute Library
- University of Bradford Library

Hull

- Carnegie Free Library, Hull, 1905–2003
- Hull Subscription Library
- University of Hull Brynmor Jones Library
- William Crampton Library, Hull

Leeds

Sheffield

- Sheffield Central Library
  - Sheffield Local Studies Library
- Sheffield University Library

York

- Minster Library, York
- York Library
- University of York Library

Elsewhere

- Harrogate Carnegie Library
- Hillsborough branch library, South Yorkshire
- Keighley Library, West Yorkshire
- Pontefract Library, West Yorkshire
- Scarborough Library
- Todmorden Industrial Society libraries
- Walkley Library, South Yorkshire

== Northern Ireland ==
- Armagh Robinson Library
- Belfast Central Library
- Linen Hall Library, Belfast
- Northern Ireland Assembly Library, Belfast
- Queen's University Belfast Lynn Building, operated as library 1868–2009

== Wales ==
Cardiff

Elsewhere

- Abergavenny Carnegie Library, 1905–2015
- Barry Council Office and Library
- Gladstone's Library, Hawarden, Flintshire
- Holyhead Market Hall
- Llandrindod Wells Library, Powys
- Monmouthshire Libraries
- National Library of Wales, Aberystwyth, Ceredigion
- Newport Central Library
- University of Wales Trinity Saint David Roderic Bowen Library and Archive, Lampeter
- Wrexham Library
  - Old Library, Wrexham, 1907–1973

== See also ==
- Copyright law of the United Kingdom
- Library associations in the United Kingdom
- List of archives in the United Kingdom
- Mass media in the United Kingdom
- Public Libraries Act 1850
- Public Libraries and Museums Act 1964
