= List of libraries in the London Borough of Barnet =

This is a list of libraries in the London Borough of Barnet

There are 15 council run libraries in the London Borough of Barnet, mobile library and home library services, and a local studies and archives library. The borough's local libraries have books, large print, books on tape, books on CD language courses, music CDs, DVDs, videos, newspapers, magazines, PC games, sheet music and vocal scores. Internet access is provided in all local libraries. The local studies and archives centre is in Mill Hill, providing reference access to local materials dating back to the 16th century and with a number of information sheets on local topics. Libraries in Barnet provide the specialist collections, within Greater London for Alzheimer's disease, art, cancer, Jewish interests and sociology.

The British Library has its newspaper section in the borough at Colindale.

Name	Address	Notes	Image	Coordinates
Burnt Oak	Watling Avenue			51.6032°N 0.2632°W
Childs Hill	Cricklewood Lane			51.5623°N 0.2008°W
Chipping Barnet	Stapylton Road			51.6562°N 0.2046°W
Church End	Hendon Lane	Built in 1964. The original Church End library was replaced by a new building in 2017.		51.599959°N 0.195194°W
East Barnet	Brookhill Road			51.6443°N 0.1616°W
East Finchley	High Road	Built in 1938 in a Neo-Georgian style. Grade II listed.		51.5939°N 0.1678°W
Edgware	Hale Lane			51.6163°N 0.2741°W
Friern Barnet	Friern Barnet Road	In a stone and brick, Tudor style. Opened in 1934.		51.6135°N 0.1535°W
Golders Green	Golders Green Road	The first purpose-built library in the Municipal Borough of Hendon. Built in 1935–6 in a Neo-Georgian style.		51.5747°N 0.2019°W
Grahame Park	The Concourse			51.6018°N 0.2449°W
Hampstead Garden Suburb	Market Place			51.5863°N 0.1833°W
Hendon	The Burroughs	The borough's main library, in a Neo-Baroque style.		51.5886°N 0.2288°W
Mill Hill	Hartley Avenue	A single storey building, built in 1937 in a Neo-Georgian style.		51.6153°N 0.2432°W
North Finchley	Ravensdale Avenue	Built in 1936 in a Neo-Georgian style.		51.6185°N 0.1759°W
Osidge	Brunswick Park Road			51.6303°N 0.1491°W
South Friern	Colney Hatch Lane			51.6005°N 0.1481°W

== See also ==
- List of libraries in the United Kingdom
