= The Wintour vestments =

Set of Catholic vestments and altarpieces

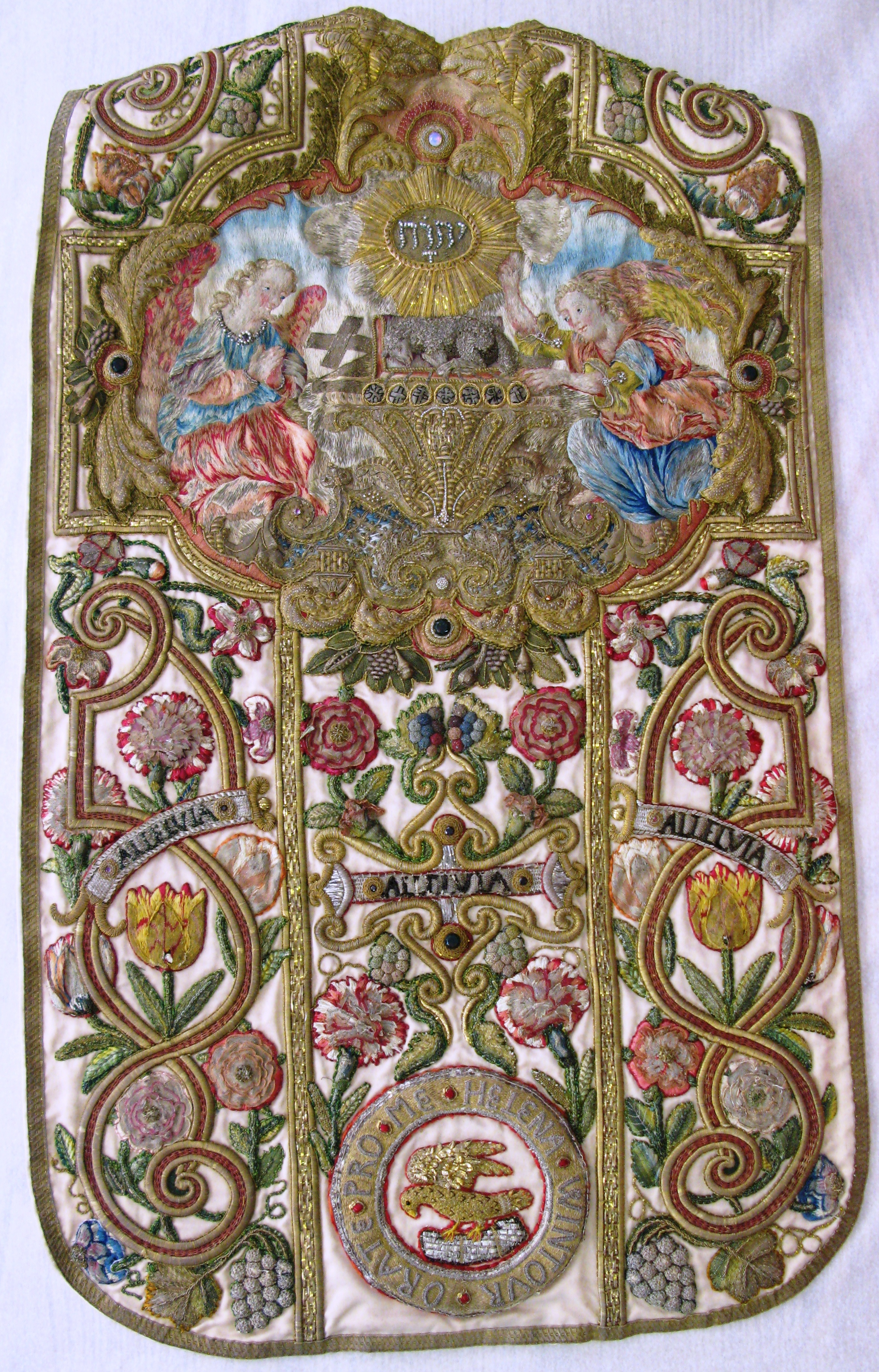
White "Alleluia" chasuble. A white vestment containing symbolic flowers, and birds, as well as 'IHS' on the back, made in the latter part of Helena's life. Currently held at the Stonyhurst Collections.

The Wintour vestments are a set of Catholic vestments and altarpieces made by the English recusant Catholic and seamstress Helena Wintour (c. 1600–5 May 1671). They are currently held in two halves at Douai Abbey and Stonyhurst College.

== Helena Wintour's life ==
Helena Wintour was a recusant Catholic living in England, and a talented seamstress. Her father, Robert Wintour, was executed for his role in the Gunpowder Plot in 1605, along with Helena's uncle, Thomas Wintour. The family's status as recusant Catholics (from the Latin verb recusare, meaning "to refuse") in Protestant England meant that they were obliged to pay fines for practicing their illegal Catholic faith and often opted to send their sons abroad to be educated in Catholic colleges on the continent. Despite all the hardship suffered from practicing her religion, Helena remained a devout Catholic all her life. On her death, Helena requested that the Jesuits set up a secret Catholic school in her home of Badge Court in Worcestershire where recusant Catholics could send their children, rather than sending them across the sea to the continent.

== Embroideries ==
Unlike some of her contemporaries, such as Elizabeth, Countess of Shrewsbury, who employed 'broiderers' to draw out their designs for them, Helena designed and made all of her vestments herself. She designed the vestments with the Society of Jesus (Jesuits) in mind; this is clear from both the symbolism she used and from her will which bequeathes all the vestments to the Society of Jesus. Shortly after Helena's death, Lady Wintour, Helena's sister-in-law, launched a campaign claiming ownership of the vestments. Since the claims were likely to attract dangerous official attention towards the Jesuits, her demands were met and she was granted half of the Wintour vestments. The Wintour collection has remained in two halves to this day; Lady Wintour's half were kept in the family until they were donated to the Benedictine community and were recently transferred to Douai Abbey Library. The half belonging to the Jesuits are now in the hands of Stonyhurst College. An exhibition in 2016 held at Douai Abbey reunited the two halves of the Wintour collection for the first time since 1671.

== Symbolism ==
The Wintour vestments demonstrate a large array of Catholic and Jesuit symbolism. The most notable Jesuit influence on the vestments is the Jesuit IHS symbol. This symbol contains two meanings; firstly it is a simple IHS Christogram (a monogram for the Greek spelling of Jesus Christ, which translates as ihsous) used by the Catholic Church. The Jesuit version of this christogram contains the heart and three nails in the shape of a V below the letters IHS, so that one sees IHSV. "IHSV" can be interpreted to mean In Hoc Signo Vinces, "In this sign, you shall conquer", a reference to the victory which Constantine won at the Milvian Bridge on 28 October 312 as the first Christian emperor. The heart is a reference to the sacred heart of Jesus. Other notable Jesuit influences in the vestments are the letters IG and XA, which appear on the "spangled" vestments, meaning Ignatius Loyola and Francis Xavier, both founding members of the Jesuits. Also frequently used are the letters "MAR", referring to Mary, Mother of Christ, with a heart pierced by a sword symbolising Simeon's prophecy in the temple. Birds are also used as symbols. For example, pelicans were seen to be a symbol of motherhood as they were thought to wound their own breasts to feed blood to their chicks. A pelican can be seen on the "Alleluia" vestments.
