= Bishop Turner =

Bishop Turner may refer to:

- William Turner (bishop of Buffalo) bishop of the Diocese of Buffalo, New York from 1919 to 1936
- Francis Turner (1638?-1700), 47th Bishop of Ely
- Henry McNeal Turner (1833-1915), a bishop of the African Methodist Episcopal Church
- William Turner, first Bishop of Salford from 1851 to 1872
