= Graham Parish =

Recipient of the George Cross

Graham Leslie Parish GC
- Born: 29 August 1912; Sheffield, Yorkshire
- Died: 12 September 1942 (aged 30); Khartoum Airfield, Sudan
- Burial place: Khartoum War Cemetery
- Military career
- Allegiance: United Kingdom
- Branch: Royal Air Force Volunteer Reserve
- Service years: 1940–1942
- Rank: Sergeant
- Service number: 1115314
- Conflicts: World War II †
- Awards: George Cross

Sergeant Graham Leslie Parish GC (29 August 1912 – 16 September 1942) of the Royal Air Force Volunteer Reserve was posthumously awarded the George Cross for 'gallantry of the highest order' during the crash landing of his plane in 1942.

== Biography ==
Prior to enlisting with the Royal Air Force Volunteer Reserve in August 1940, Parish, originally from Sheffield, had been employed as the Borough Librarian for Lytham St Annes at the St Annes-on-the-Sea Carnegie Library.

== 16 September 1942 ==
Parish was the observer on an aircraft operating a delivery flight to the Middle East Command which crashed after attempting to return to base in Sudan due to the failure of the port engine on 16 September 1942.

Most of the crew managed to get clear as the bomber burst into flames but one man had suffered two broken legs and was trapped. The bomber was engulfed and neither Parish or the passenger survived but when their charred bodies were recovered it was clear that Parish had carried him eight yards from the blocked emergency door to the rear turret in the hope of rescuing him, rather than save himself by climbing out through the astro hatch.

== George Cross citation ==
Notice of his award appeared in The London Gazette of 2 April 1943.

"The King has been graciously pleased to approve the posthumous award of the George Cross to: -

1115314 Sergeant Graham Leslie Parish, Royal Air Force.

Sergeant Parish was the navigator of an aircraft during a delivery flight from the United Kingdom to the Middle East Command. Shortly after taking off from an airfield in Anglo-Egyptian Sudan one morning in September, 1942, the port engine failed and the pilot attempted to return and land on the airfield. Owing to the rough nature of the ground, full use could not be made of the brakes. The aircraft struck a building on the airfield and immediately burst into flames.

All of the crew with the exception of Sergeant Parish and a passenger, whose legs were both broken, succeeded in getting free of the blazing bomber. At the time of the crash Sergeant Parish was at the astro-hatch and the passenger was at the emergency door which is in the floor of the fuselage. This door was unusable as the undercarriage had collapsed and the fuselage was resting on the ground. The fire, which completely destroyed the bomber, was so intense that no assistance could be given to the navigator or the passenger. When the blaze subsided Sergeant Parish's body was found leaning against the rear gun turret and the passenger was beside him with his arm over the airman's shoulder. As the passenger could not walk, owing to his broken legs, it is clear that Sergeant Parish has carried him from the .emergency door to the rear turret, a distance of eight yards, in the hope that both could escape through the turret. Undoubtedly both were overcome and burned to death in the attempt. Sergeant Parish could have made his escape through the astro-hatch but his unselfish desire to assist the passenger. cost him his life. He displayed gallantry of the highest order.

— London Gazette
