= Badge Court =

Coordinates: 52.3268°N 2.1387°W

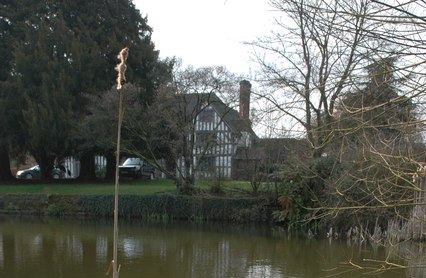
- Badge Court
- Interactive map of the Badge Court area
- Former names: Batchcott

General information
- Type: Estate
- Location: Worcestershire, United Kingdom

Technical details
- Material: Brick and wood
- Floor count: 2

Badge Court is an estate in Worcestershire, England. Originally known as Batchcott, the home's most famous occupant was Helena Wintour, daughter of Gunpowder Plot conspirator Robert Wintour.

The house was originally occupied by "an Earl of Shrewsbury". It is two stories tall, and is built of brick and wood with a tiled roof. The original design incorporated a moat, but this has now been filled in; other modern additions include a plaster front. The interior of the house features 16th-century carved oak panelling, extending from the entranceway through much of the house. The Wintour family coat of arms is still visible on the main hall ceiling and carved on an oak panel in the dining room. Other notable features include patterned tiles which ornament the fireplace in the master bedroom. Many of the tiles depict the coat of arms of the Wintours and various noble families. Among them is a tile with the name "Sir John Talbot", which likely refers to Helena Wintour's grandfather.

Helena Wintour, a Catholic, sheltered priests and held Mass at Badge Court. She embroidered the Wintour Vestments for use by the priests during their tenure at Badge Court. One lot of these richly decorated garments is now held by Stonyhurst College; the other descended through the family and are in a private collection near Tewkesbury. They have been extensively studied by Dr. Sophie Holroyd
