= Libraries and collections of Stonyhurst College =

Coordinates: 53.847°N 2.472°W

The Jesuit origins of Stonyhurst College in Lancashire, England, have enabled it to amass a large collection of books, a number of which concern recusant history, whilst artefacts from all over the world have been donated to the school by Jesuit missionaries and alumni. The school has four main libraries: the Arundell, the Bay, the Square and the More (dedicated to Saint Thomas More). It also has two museums: the Do Room and the Long Room.

== Libraries ==
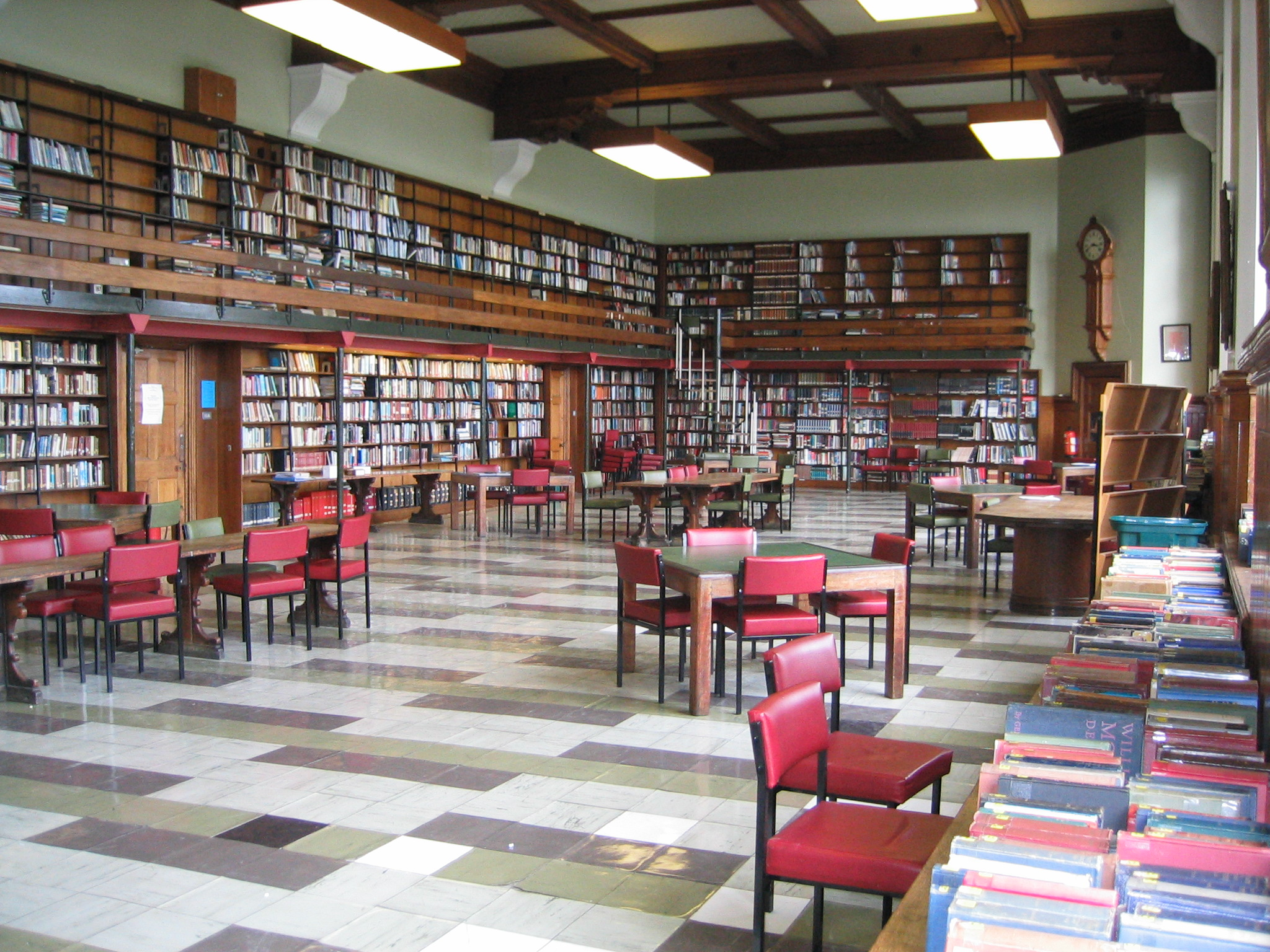
The More Library (formerly the Study Place) 1965–2003. It has since been refurbished. The clock is the only consistent link between the Study place, old and refurbished library.

The More Library is the main library for student use. It was opened in 1933 on the ground floor in what were, until then, the Higher Line and Lower Line reading rooms, and are today classrooms. It was moved upstairs to occupy its present home in the former Study Place in 1966. It was refurbished and opened by Paul Johnson, an old boy, in 2004 (Johnson is the last person to have worn an 18th-century school uniform preserved in the school, in a pageant during World War II, when he was the only boy small enough to wear it). At present it contains some 11,500 volumes. When the library was the Study Place, it was filled with rows of desks where pupils would engage in private study under Jesuit supervision; the principle behind the Study Place has been revived with the creation of new playroom-specific study centres in the Campion Room, Old Gymnasium, Shirk, Magazine Dormitory and Dormitory 5.

The 'House Libraries' (the Arundell, the Bay, and the Square) include artefacts from the Society of Jesus and English Catholicism. The Arundell Library, presented in 1837 by Everard, 11th Baron Arundell of Wardour, is the most significant. It is not only a country-house library from Wardour Castle but also has a notable collection of incunabula, medieval manuscripts, and volumes of Jacobite interest. Signal among its books associated with historical figures is "Queen Mary's Book of Hours" which belonged to Mary Tudor and is thought to have been given by Mary, Queen of Scots, to her chaplain on the scaffold. The manuscript Le Livre de Seyntz Medicines was written in 1354 by Henry, Duke of Lancaster. To these were added the archives of the English Province of the Society of Jesus. These included 16th-century manuscript verses by St Robert Southwell, the letters of St Edmund Campion (1540–81) and holographs of the 19th-century poet Gerard Manley Hopkins. The Arundell Library held the seventh century Stonyhurst Gospel of St John, before it was loaned, then sold, to the British Library. There is also a first folio of Shakespeare.

Until 1974, the House Libraries complex was much larger, with the Arundell and Square Libraries opening into a further room, originally built as the Boys' Chapel, but converted into a three storey museum and library, known as 'the Museum', complete with ornamental railings, spiral staircases, and glass display cabinets featuring natural history artefacts. The Museum was dismantled to make way for the Higher Line Common Room in 1974. Many of its exhibits had already been sold. Originally, the Sodality Chapel was an ante-chapel before the conversion of the Boys' Chapel next door into the Museum, hence its connection to the Higher Line Common Room. A dedicated archivist and part-time librarian now oversee the contents of the House Libraries, taking on the task from Fr Frederick J. Turner, SJ. Since their appointment, access for pupils to these former Jesuit libraries has been opened up and a number of lost or unknown items have been discovered, including a third Wintour vestment, the so-called Spangled Stuffe Suit which had been missing since 1670.

== Museums ==
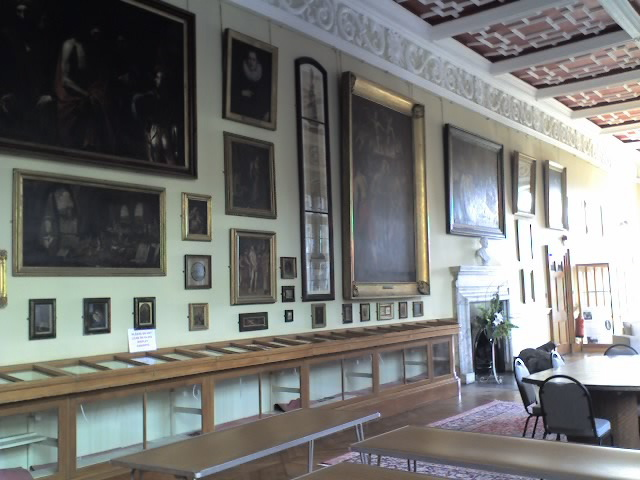
The Long Room in 2006

The Long Room functioned as a museum of stuffed birds in Victorian display cabinets, the Waterton Collection, donated by old boy explorer Charles Waterton until they were transferred to the corridor linking the Old Infirmary with the school. It had been Waterton's wish for this record of his lifetime's work to be on display in his former school; the collection was lent to Wakefield Museum in the 1970s. Thankfully and due to the tireless work of the current curator Jan Graffius some of the collection has now returned to its home in the Long Room. The Long Room was used as a study room from the 1970s until 2003 when it was restored and once again used for a display of items from the College collections.

A lesser-known fact about the Long Room is that, above the bay, between its ceiling and the room above, exists one of the two remaining priest holes or hiding places, dating back to the house's time as a private residence in the period of Recusancy, when Jesuits and other Catholic priests were hunted by the authorities. The other hiding place is in the gatehouse, approached up a false chimney. Another was located in the Duchess' Rooms before they were pulled down to make way for the Arundell Library wing; it was hidden behind a bookcase, opened by a secret spring. A fourth was under a flagstone in the original washing place, and a further hidden behind a false beam nearby.

The Do Room, re-opened in 2000 following replacement of the beams which support the Top Refectory above, features an exhibition of the School's history and items from the collections, including photographs, a Victorian chamber-pot complete with the College emblem, the desk used and engraved by Sir Arthur Conan Doyle during his time as a pupil, and a door belonging to an earlier building on the site.

== Collections ==
Among those collections held from public view are the numerous blood-soaked garments from Jesuits martyred in Japan, the ropes used to quarter Saint Edmund Campion, and a thorn said to be from no less than the crown of thorns placed upon Jesus' head. The school also holds half of the Wintour Vestments.

The school has a number of fine paintings, although in more recent times the collection has been depleted. The Four Doctors by Jacob Jordaens and/or Rubens was sold at Christies in 1996. A small very early anonymous painting of the Sacred Heart of Jesus remains missing after being stolen, as do a number of Rembrandt etchings. Portraits include Tsar Nicholas I of Russia and the Jesuit Henry Garnet. In the Stuart Parlour are portraits of a number of Jacobites including James Francis Edward Stuart, and his sons Charles Edward Stuart and Henry Benedict Stuart. A painting by John Lavery was stolen in 1994 but recovered in 2019. There are also a number of original engravings by Rembrandt and Dürer.

The Stonyhurst Chronicles of Jean Froissart, captured at the Battle of Agincourt in 1415, are currently on loan to the Royal Armouries in Leeds, where they are the centre-piece of a new exhibition.

== Works formerly in the collections ==
A number of works with national or international significance have been sold or placed on permanent loan to museums in recent decades; items formerly at Stonyhurst are normally on display at the British Museum, British Library, and Victoria and Albert Museum.

The Stonyhurst Gospel (or St Cuthbert Gospel), a 7th-century manuscript that was buried with Saint Cuthbert and has the oldest known leather bookbinding of any Western book, was loaned to the British Museum, then the British Library, between 1974 and 2012 when after a public appeal it was bought by the library from the Society of Jesus. It has been on display between Durham and London since 2014, alternating between the two cities.

The Stonyhurst Collection of Native American artefacts is now in the British Museum, with some items on permanent display, where they were on loan since 1977, before being sold for £650,000 in 2004.

A sumptuous gold-embroidered cope, decorated with Tudor roses and portcullises, from a set of vestments used by the household of Henry VII and bequeathed by him to Westminster Abbey, has been in the Victoria and Albert Museum since 1999. It is said to have been borrowed back by Henry VIII to wear at the Field of the Cloth of Gold in 1520.

Temporary exhibition loans have included Stonyhurst MS 60, the "Hours of Katherine Bray", a book of hours with Flemish illumination of about 1490, to the Royal Academy in London and the Getty Museum in California in 2003-2004 for "Illuminating the Renaissance". The 2011 British Museum exhibition on "Relics", also Baltimore and New York, included items from the collection including a modern reliquary.

== See also ==
- College of St Omer
- St Gordianus, interred in the school

== Sources ==
- Chadwick, Hubert, S.J. (1962). St Omers to Stonyhurst, Burns & Oats. No ISBN
- Walsh, R.R. (1989) Stonyhurst War Record
- Muir, T.E. (1992). Stonyhurst College 1593–1993, James & James (Publishers) Ltd. ISBN 0-907383-32-7
- Kirby, Henry L. and Walsh, R.Raymond (1987). The Seven V.C.s of Stonyhurst College, T.H.C.L. Books. ISBN 0-948494-04-2
- The Authorities of Stonyhurst College (1963), A Stonyhurst Handbook for Visitors and Others, 3rd edition
- Hewitson, A. (Preston, 1878), Stonyhurst College, Present and Past: Its History, Discipline, Treasures and Curiosities, 2nd edition
- Stonyhurst College website
