= Lytham Library =

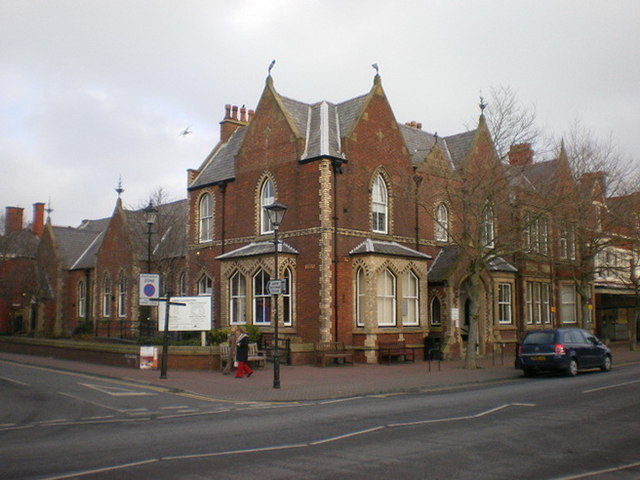
- Lytham Library, 2009

- Location within Lytham St Annes

General information
- Type: Library
- Architectural style: Gothic
- Location: Clifton Street, Lytham, Lancashire, England
- Coordinates: 53.7375°N 2.9580°W
- Opened: 30 August 1878

Design and construction
- Architect: John Collinson

Listed Building – Grade II
- Official name: Lytham Library
- Designated: 15-Feb-1993
- Reference no.: 1291791

Lytham library was built originally as a Mechanics Institute. It included a small library of books and a reading room and opened on 30 August 1878. The building was extended in 1898 to celebrate Queen Victoria's Diamond Jubilee, including a new reading room, gymnasium and classrooms. The extension was opened by the Duke of Norfolk. In 1922 the library became part of the Municipal Borough of Lytham St Annes with the amalgamation of St Anne's on the Sea and Lytham Urban District Councils. In 1974 the administration of the library was taken over by Lancashire County Council. In Buildings of England Hartwell and Pevsner describe its 'Dark red and yellow and black brick dressings, including dentil sill bands and 'quoins'. Steep coped gables with jaunty finials, and lancets. Bay windows of yellow brick'.

== The building and opening of the Library ==
The Lytham Times of September 4, 1878 included a 2-page supplement celebrating the opening of the Institute by the Right Honourable George Cavendish Bentnick, MP. It describes a public meeting, addressed by the Bishop of Manchester, and held on 22 October 1876 which was arranged to examine the possibilities of the building of the Institute. There was an initial donation of £300 from Lady Eleanor Cecily Clifton of Lytham Hall. Numerous other donations followed including £1000 by the Misses Hewitt of Lytham. Their contribution is commemorated in the name of the Hewitt Lecture Room.

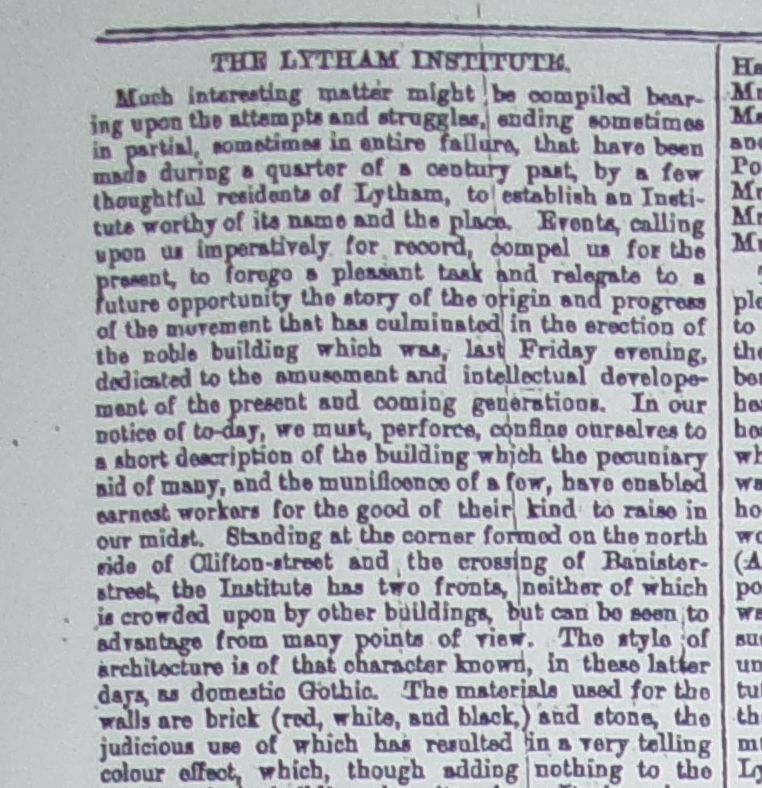
Lytham Times of 4 September 1878

The building and development of the institute was overseen by a committee chaired by the Reverend Henry Beauchamp Hawkins of St Cuthbert's Church, the parish church of Lytham, and the Lytham Times supplement details the various local firms which had worked on the project. It was designed and built by John Collinson of Lytham. Gas fittings were supplied by Mr Rainford of Lytham. Hot water apparatus was supplied by Messrs. Seward of Preston. A Mr Poulton oversaw the fitting of the library and a Captain Banister acted as clerk of works. The site had been donated by the squire, John Talbot Clifton of Lytham Hall.

The Preston Chronicle of 28 October 1876 describes the meeting of 22 October of that year: "The chairman in opening the proceedings, stated that for some time the young men of Lytham had felt the want of a place where they could meet for social intercourse, and to read and think". In the 1870s women's sphere of influence would have been seen as primarily home and domestic life so it's not surprising that the Institute was conceived as a place for men to meet and talk.

At the opening ceremony a Mr Hodgson Pratt was present, presumably the same man who was a member of the council of the Working Men's Club and Institute Union and founder of the International Arbitration and Peace Association. He also spoke to the gathering and, in reference to the Reform Bills, commented that, 'With every fresh extension of the suffrage it became their duty to see that the people were educated and qualified for the new and great responsibilities rested in them. There was an immense amount of political ignorance in the country, and he would advise working men to read carefully and thoroughly political history'. It would be 1918 before women over 30 were given the vote and another 10 years that before there were equal voting rights. At the time of the opening of the Lytham Institute, it would be a place that men could educate themselves for their new role in the democratic system.

== The development of the Library ==
Barrett's 1929 Directory of Blackpool of the Fylde describes Lytham Institute as 'a neat Gothic building' which 'contains billiard, reading, and lecture rooms and a library of 3500 volumes'. It goes on to describe how the extension was opened by the Duke of Norfolk on 8 January 1898. The extension included a reading room, gymnasium and additional classrooms. The original building had cost about £3000 to build in 1878 and the extension a further £1500. The architect was Thomas Grimble of Warton Street in Lytham and the building contractor was a George Myers. In 1929 the Borough Librarian was Bertha Barrow who became Librarian at St Anne's Library in 1906 and was to remain librarian of the Borough until 1939.

== Library closure 2016 ==
As a result of local government funding issues, Lytham Library was closed as part of a contentious series of library and museum closures by Lancashire County Council in September 2016.
