= Lynn Building =

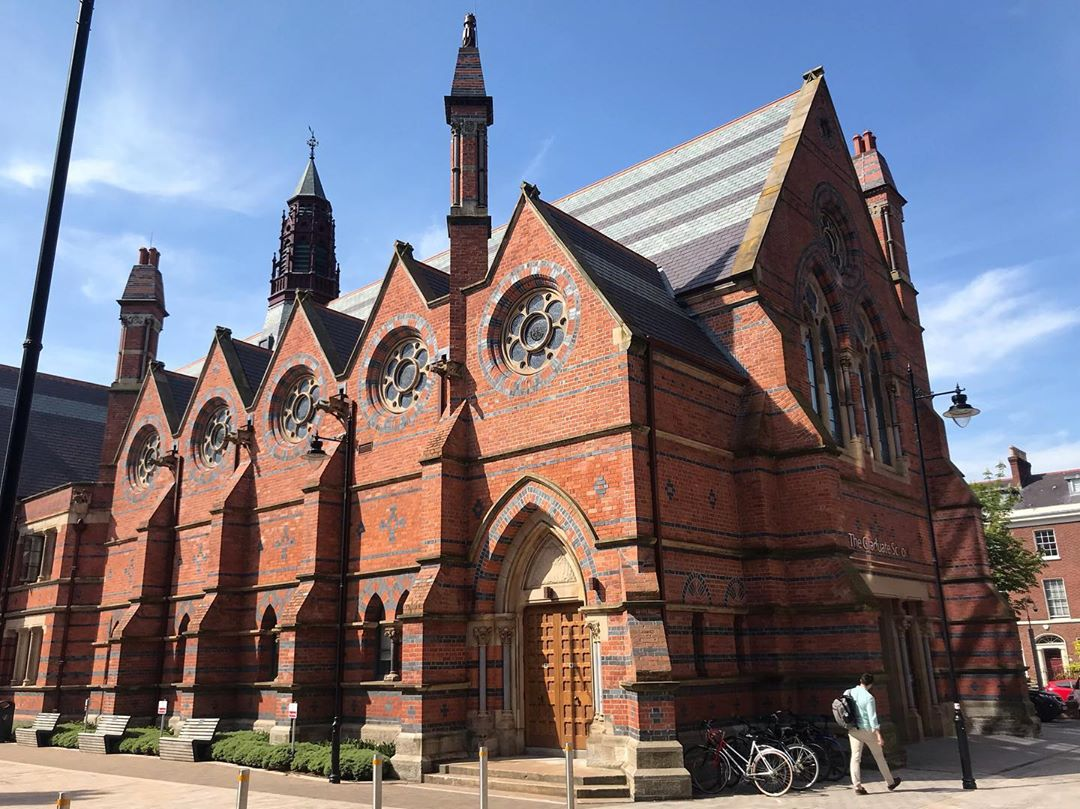
- Lynn Building
- Interactive map of the Lynn Building area

General information
- Architectural style: High Victorian Gothic
- Location: University Square, Belfast, United Kingdom
- Coordinates: 54°35′47″N 5°55′48″W
- Current tenants: Queen's University Belfast
- Completed: 1868
- Renovated: 2015
- Client: Queen's College, Belfast

Design and construction
- Architect: William Henry Lynn

The Lynn Building is a Victorian structure in Belfast, Northern Ireland, United Kingdom. It was designed in the Ruskinian Gothic style by the British architect William Henry Lynn, after whom it is now named. It was completed in 1868. A part of Queen's University Belfast, it was originally built as the institution's library, but today houses the graduate school.

== History ==
Queen's College, Belfast was chartered in 1845 as one of three constituent colleges of the Queen's University of Ireland. Initially having just 23 professors and 195 students, the college could be housed entirely within the main Lanyon Building. Initially the examinations hall (now known as the Great Hall) inside the Lanyon Building served additionally as the library. However the expansion of the institution meant that by the 1860s a discrete building was needed to house the college's growing library. The architect William Henry Lynn was duly commissioned to design the structure.

The college was awarded a government grant of £4,600 (equivalent to £523,000 in 2023) to construct the library, which was completed in 1868.

The continued growth of Queen's University of Belfast (as it had become in 1908 as a result of the Irish Universities Act 1908) saw the need to expand the library further. WH Lynn won the tender to augment his initial building by anonymously entering the competition to design the expansion. With construction undertaken between 1912 and 1914 it was one of his last projects (Lynn died in 1915).

Alterations were carried out in the 1950s, at which time the poet Philip Larkin – who worked as a sub-librarian for the university between 1950 and 1955 – described the building as a ’perfect little paradise of a library’. Further alterations were made in the 1980s. The Lynn Building was closed in 2009, following the opening of the McClay Library. It was restored in 2015, at which point it was also adapted for use as the graduate school.

== Architecture ==
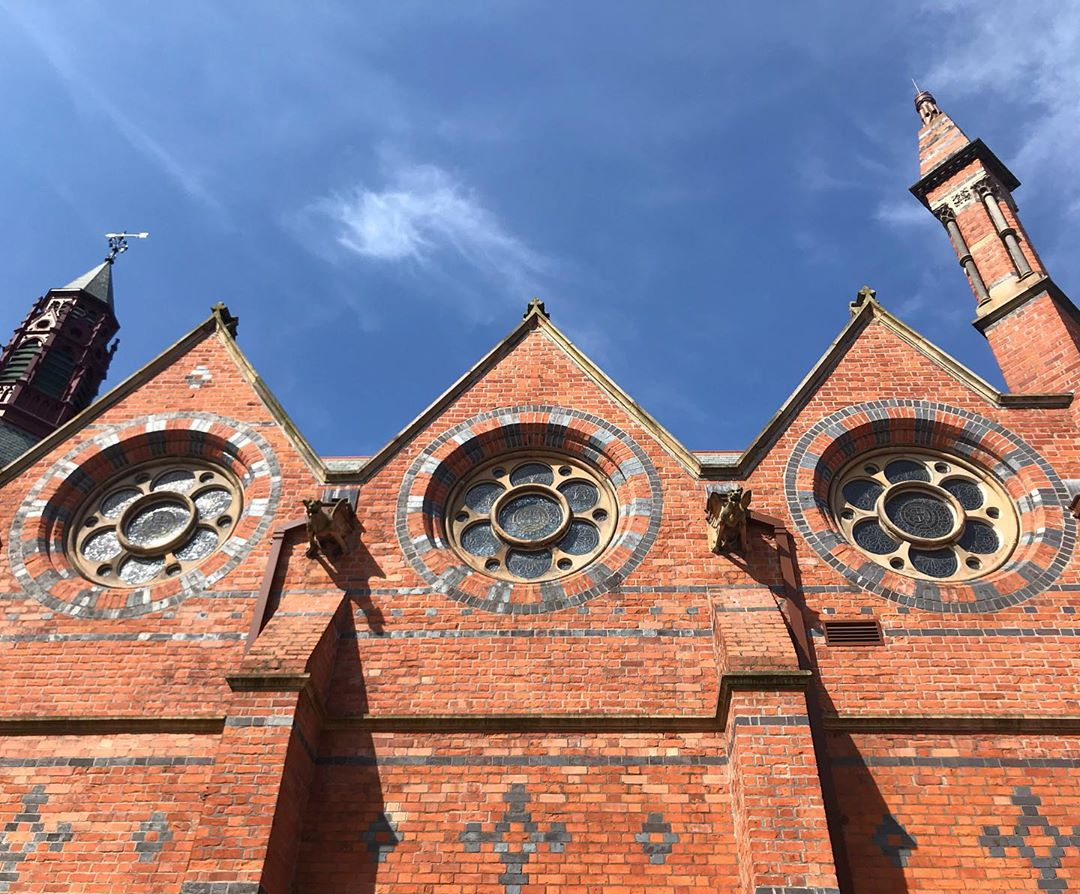
Rose windows within polychromatic brickwork on side-gables, interspersed between aquiline gargoyles above buttresses

Unlike the university's Tudor Revival Lanyon Building, the Lynn Building is in the High Victorian Gothic style which was prominent during the mid-nineteenth century. It features numerous examples of the form of Neo-Gothic championed by the critic John Ruskin, including polychrome (the roof tiling and brickwork), varying materials (window tracery, bases and columns of different stone types set into polychromatic brickwork), and detailing (gargoyles).

Anatomically, the structure is noted for its large number of rose windows, engaged buttresses (both setback and diagonal), and side-gables.

== See also ==
- Architecture of Belfast Buildings and structures in Belfast
