= St Annes-on-the-Sea Carnegie Library =

St Anne's on the Sea Library
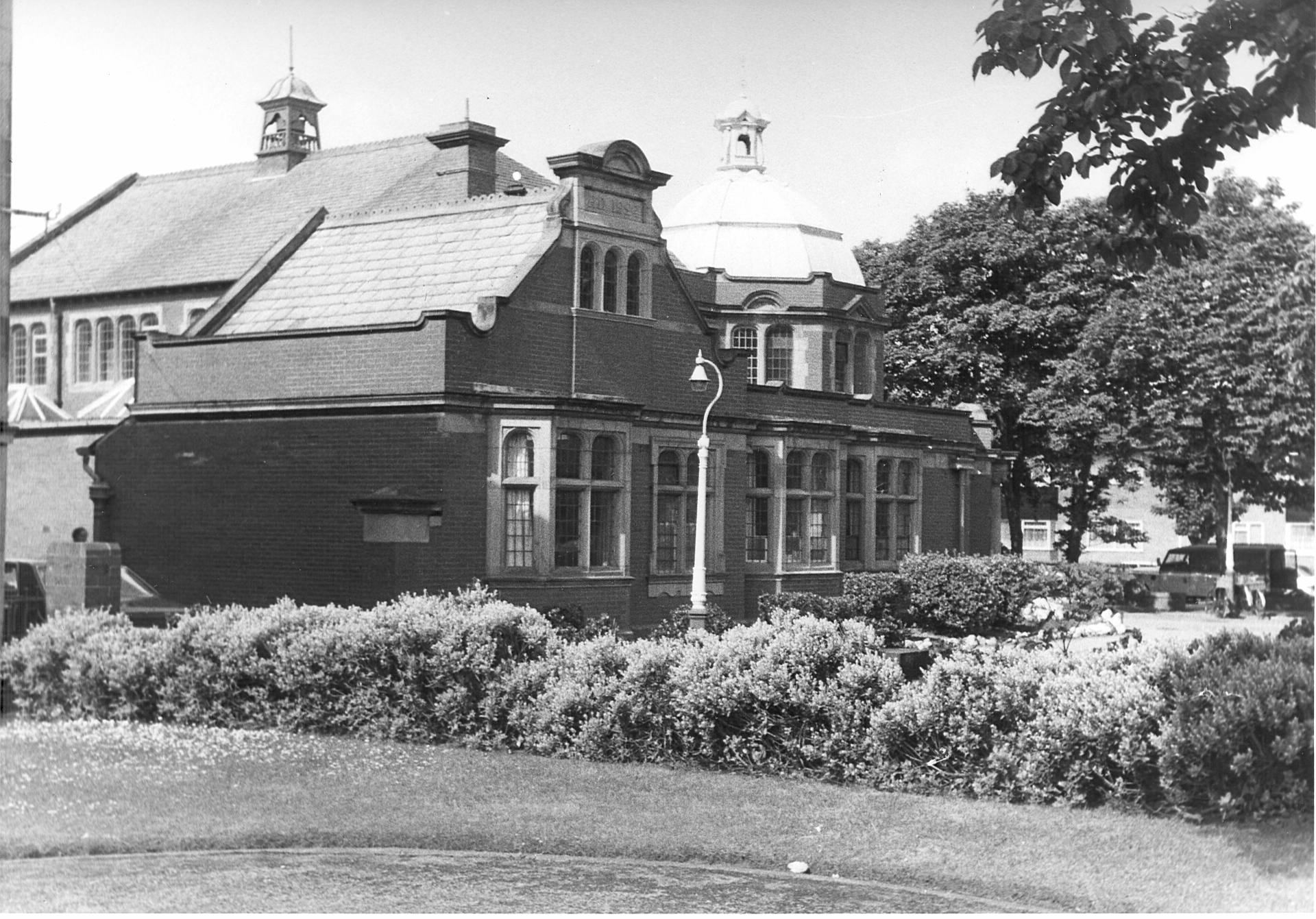
- St Anne's Public Library c.1980

- Location within Lytham St Annes

General information
- Type: Library
- Architectural style: Low Baroque
- Location: Clifton Drive South, St Anne's-on-the-Sea, Lancashire, England
- Coordinates: 53.7471°N 3.0266°W
- Opened: 10 January 1906

Design and construction
- Architect: John Dent Harker
- Main contractor: Samuel Wilson

Listed Building – Grade II
- Official name: District Central Library
- Designated: 15 February 1993
- Reference no.: 1218789

The Carnegie Library is in Lytham St Annes, Lancashire, England. The foundation stone of St. Anne's Library was laid in August 1904 and the building was officially opened on 10 January 1906. The land was given by the St. Anne's on the Sea Land and Building Company, and Andrew Carnegie paid for the building itself. This was the first library in the town. Until 2016, there was also a library at Lytham.

The library was administered by the St Anne's on the Sea Urban District until 1922 when the Urban District Council amalgamated with Lytham UDC to form the municipal borough of Lytham St. Annes. The Borough continued to operate the service until 1974 when the Library Service was taken over by Lancashire County Council and became the District Central Library of Fylde District.

== The development and opening of the building ==
Councillor L S Stott, Chairman of St Anne's on the Sea Urban District Council had been in communication with the American Philanthropist and benefactor of public libraries, Andrew Carnegie and Council Minutes (General Purposes Committee) of 29 June 1903 report that he received "an intimation from Mr Carnegie's private secretary that he would give the sum of £3,500 for the erection of a library".

The offer was gratefully accepted and a sub committee was appointed to consider a suitable site for the library. A number of options were considered including a site on St Annes Road East but the offer of a site on Clifton Drive South from the Land and Building Company was eventually settled on.

In October 1903 architects were invited to submit designs for the library – the total cost was not to exceed £3,500. Mr John Dent Harker of St Anne's won the contract and was appointed as the architect and in March 1904 the tender for the building was awarded to Mr Samuel Wilson also of St Anne's. The building process wasn't without difficulty and the Council experienced some problems with the building contractor. The Council Minutes (Library and Baths Committee) of 30 October 1905 note that "...the Architect submitted correspondence which had taken place between himself and the Contractor with reference to the great delay there has been in completing the Library building; he also reported that he had given the Contractor seven days notice to complete the work, and that the Contractor had commenced on the last day of the notice to proceed to complete the work.",

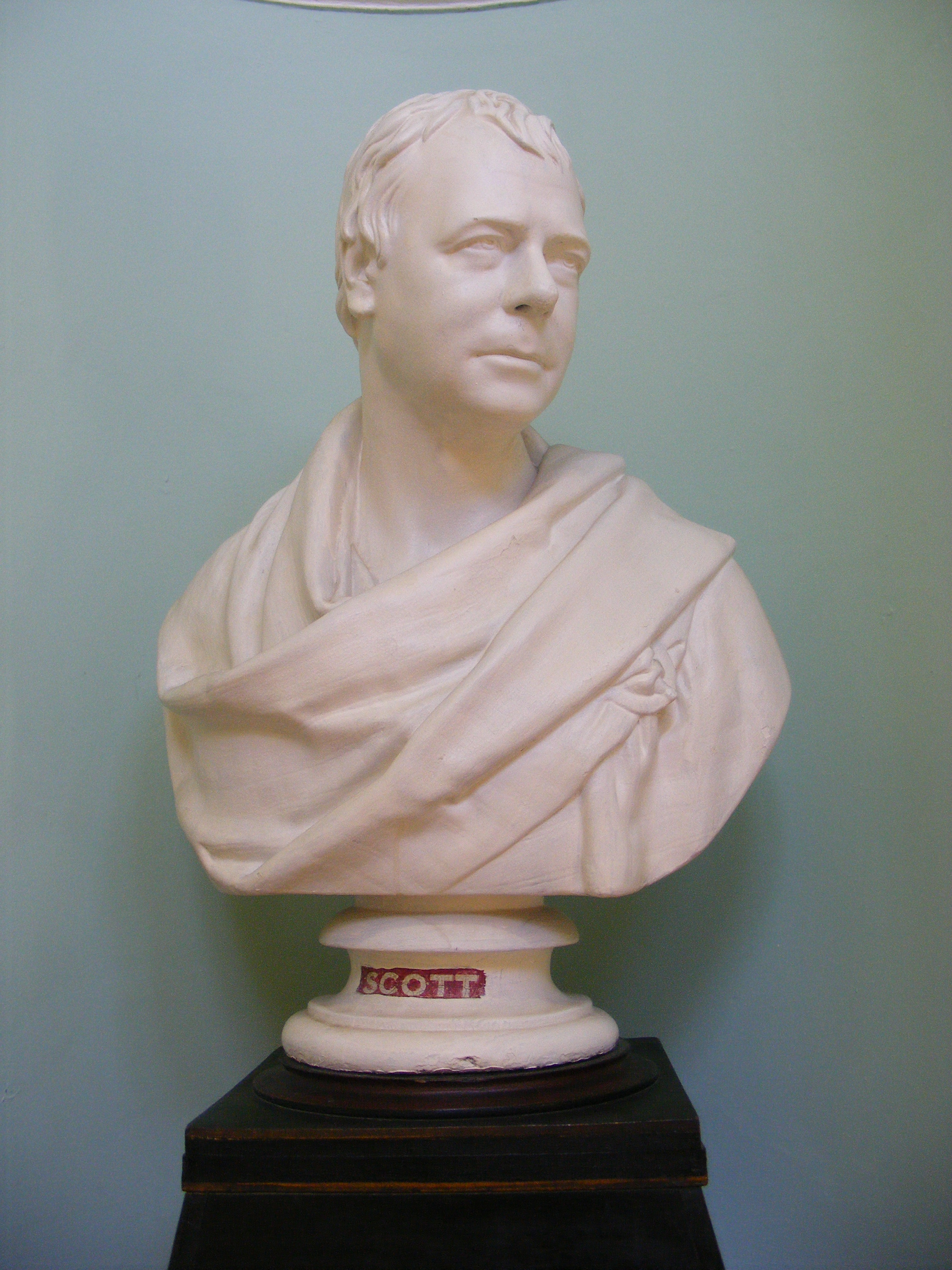
Bust of Sir Walter Scott in the Entrance Hall of St Anne's Library

These problems were, however, overcome and St. Annes Library was opened on Wednesday 10 January 1906, the official ceremony being performed by Councillor George Walters Spring, J.P. The land was given by the Land and Building Company and Andrew Carnegie paid for the building itself.

This description of the building comes from the St Anne's on the Sea Express of 10 January 1906 - "It is convenient and effective in arrangements and presents an imposing appearance. The style is an adaptation of Victorian Renaissance……The main entrance leads through to a vestibule to a large octagonal hall. Lighted by clerestory windows and surmounted by a domed roof. On the right side of the entrance hall is a niche containing a bust of Sir Walter Scott.", Pevsner's Buildings of England - Lancashire:North describes the building as ".....every inch the early 20C Carnegie Library. Low, Baroque of red brick and buff terracotta with a corner entrance flanked by tiny oculi and an octagonal domed tower rising behind. Light and airy inside, with a range of low arches to one side and friendly bays on the other".

In the Library's first Annual Report submitted in July 1907, it states that prior to 1 April 1906, 1500 borrowers' tickets had been issued although "a large proportion were not generally in use". In the subsequent year, another 637 had been issued to bring the total to 2137. The number of books issued in the year ending Mar 1907 was 48,468 – the vast majority of those being fiction. A writer for the St Anne's on the Sea Express might have remarked on this. In the article on the opening of the Library on 10 January 1906, it was commented that "The reading of novels is not calculated to bring out the best that is in men and women" which was reason for also stocking the library with volumes that might benefit the more "serious side" of mankind, such as "Books treating of poetry, travel, social science, political economy, natural history, philosophy etc."

In the years after the opening of the building the service expanded and by 1929 an extension was thought to be urgently required. The council were granted permission to borrow £2,000 to carry out the building in April 1930 and in March 1931 tenders for the work were accepted. The building work was carried out by John Heap and Sons of St Anne's and the constructional steelwork by John Booth and Sons of Hulton Steelworks, Bolton. The extension was opened on 25 September 1932 and a reorganised lending department opened on 9 October 1931.

== Library staff ==
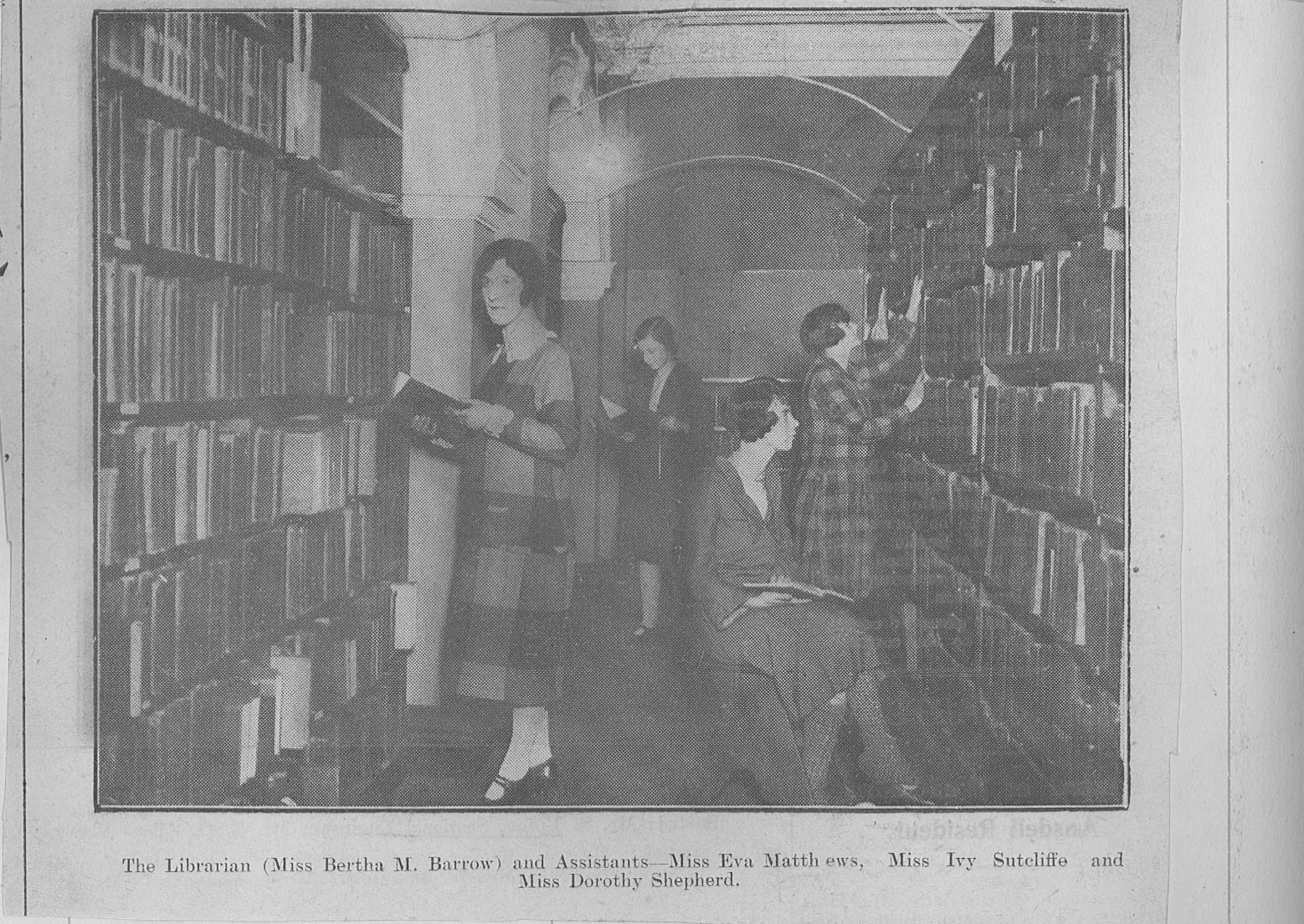
Bertha Barrow and Library Assistants, January 1927

The first Librarian in charge, appointed in July 1905, was a Mr T P Thompson who had come from Bolton where he had worked at the Bolton Free Library for 14 years. By March 1906, however, he had been replaced by Miss Bertha M Barrow. The minutes of the Library and Baths Committee of the Council reports that after his resignation, her appointment was accepted on 26 February 1906 at a salary of £60 per annum. The minutes state that it was resolved "That a lady librarian be appointed to fill the vacancy caused by the resignation of Mr T. P Thompson". The St Anne's on the Sea Express of 7 March 1906 tells us that "Miss Barrow was an applicant when the council advertised last year, but the committee had, at that time, resolved to appoint a male librarian. The committee therefore knew her qualifications and for that reason the vacant post was not again advertised. The Council, we believe, will not regret their choice." The Express also commented that as at that time 70% of those who attended St Annes Library were women the appointment was especially appropriate.

She found an eloquent champion in the Express—on 18 April 1906, after she had reorganised the library it commented that " ……Miss Barrow has great reason to feel proud of all that she has accomplished in such a short space of time". An enlightened position for the newspaper in an age when women hadn't yet achieved the vote and although, the 1901 census shows that over 30% of women over the age of 10 were in paid employment, 80% of those were in domestic service, other services or manufacturing. At the time less than 9% of working women were in the professions let alone in a management position. Miss Barrow actually served the people of St Anne's for over 30 years and retired from her post just before the start of World War II in August 1939.

Bertha Barrow was succeeded by Graham Leslie Parish from Sheffield who was 26 at the time of his appointment and was chosen from 50 applicants. His tenure in the post was cut short due to his death in World War Two.

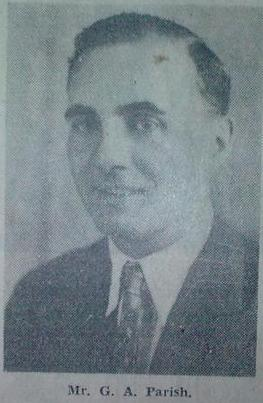
Graham Parish, Lytham St Annes Borough Librarian, appointed in 1939

After the outbreak of war he joined the RAF and in September 1942 he was a navigator on a delivery flight to the Middle East command. When the plane was forced down on rough ground at a Sudan airfield it hit a building and burst into flames. Although the crew escaped unhurt Sergeant Parish went back for a passenger they were carrying, a Sudan government meteorologist called Mr J Flower. Both men were killed in the blazing plane. In April 1943 Graham Parish was awarded the George Cross posthumously for his brave and selfless actions and "gallantry of the highest order". The Times of 3 April 1943 reported "As the passenger could not walk, owing to his broken legs, it is clear that Sgt. Parish had carried him from the emergency door to the rear turret in the hope that both could escape through the turret. Sgt Parish could have escaped through the astro-hatch but his unselfish desire to assist the passenger cost him his life",

== Bibliography ==
- Lytham St Annes Civic Society (2006), The listed buildings of Lytham St Annes.
- Peter Shakeshaft(2008), St Anne's on the Sea: a history, Carnegie Publishing.
- St Anne's on the Sea Urban District Council, Minutes of Proceedings of the St Anne's on the Sea Urban District Council - various dates noted in text.
- St Anne's on the Sea Express - Various dates noted in text.
- The Times - Date noted in text.
- Lancashire Library, Fylde District (c1970), St Annes Carnegie Library: in the beginning - Duplicated typescript
- Clare Hartwell and Nikolaus Pevsner (2009), The buildings of England - Lancashire: North, Yale University Press.
