= The Fielden Free Library =

Fielden Free Library
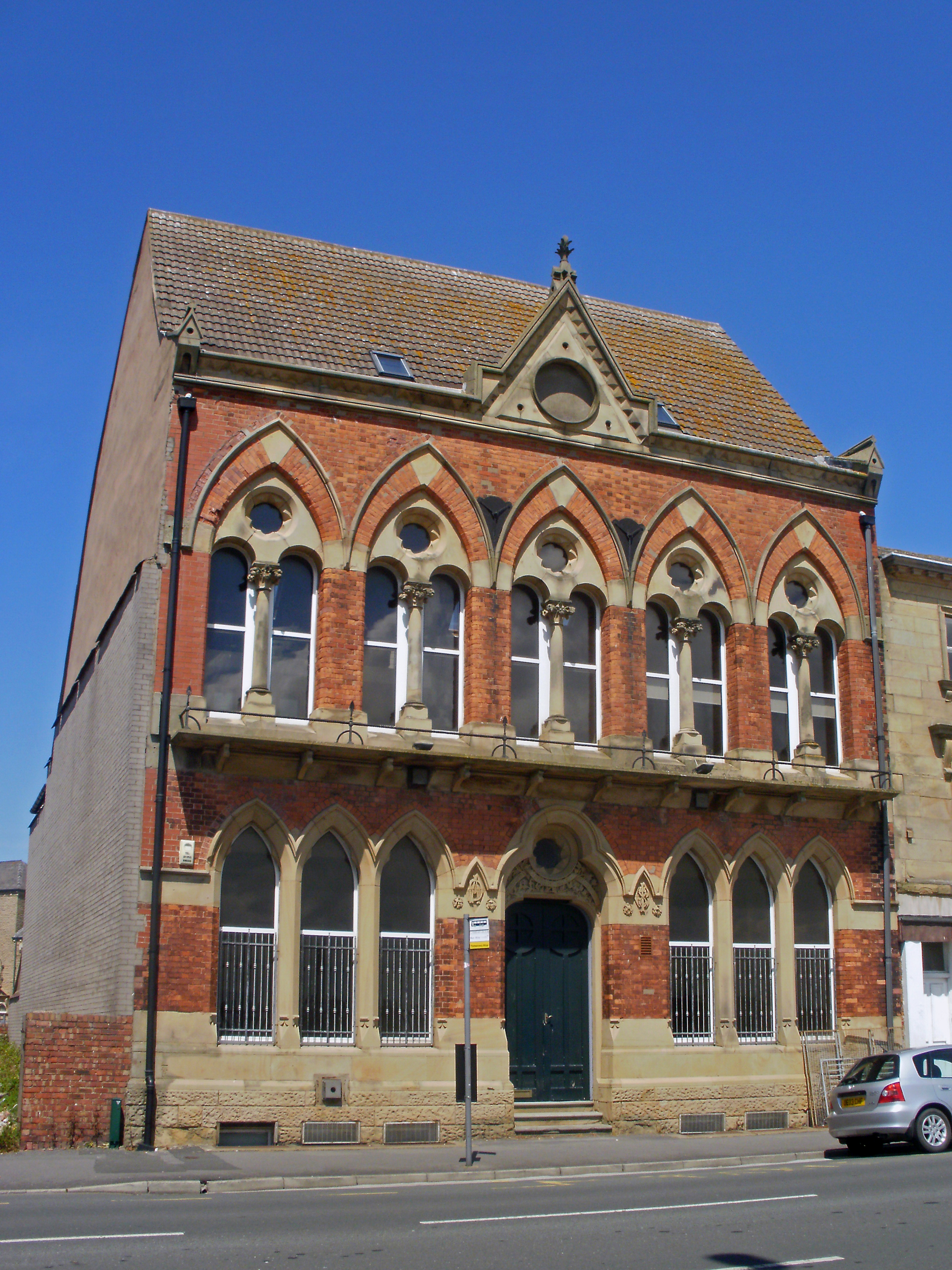
- Former Public Library, Fleetwood, 2011

- Location within Lancashire

General information
- Type: Library
- Architectural style: Venetian Gothic
- Location: Dock Street, Fleetwood, Lancashire, England
- Coordinates: 53.9248°N 3.0079°W

Design and construction
- Main contractor: Thomas Atkinson Drummond

Listed Building – Grade II
- Official name: Fleetwood Museum and Public Library, Fleetwood
- Designated: 31 March 1978
- Reference no.: 1072428

What became the Fielden Free Library started life as the Whitworth Institute, built in the Venetian Gothic style in 1863. It was bought by Samuel Fielden in 1887 and offered to the town as a public library. It remained the town's library until a new building was opened by Lancashire County Council in May 1988.

== Benjamin Whitworth, Samuel Fielden and the Free Library ==
The Institute was paid for by Benjamin Whitworth from Manchester who appears in the 1861 Census on Queens Terrace in Fleetwood as a Cotton Broker and Ship Owner. It was built on the site of the former Mechanic's Institute and played a similar role in offering a social centre for working people and a place of education and recreation. The builder was Thomas Atkinson Drummond whose company built a great deal of the original town of Fleetwood. Above the entrance the words 'Public Hall and Reading Room' are carved along with the year 'AD 1863'.

One of the Librarians at the Institute was the dialect poet Samuel Laycock who spent a short here from 1867 before moving to Blackpool.

Samuel Fielden bought the library from Whitworth in 1887 and gave it to the town on condition that the Improvement Commissioners adopted the Free Public Libraries Act. This proposal wasn't adopted immediately but after initial indecision it was accepted and the building became the Fielden Free Library. The Fielden Free Library Committee minute book, on 23 August 1887 records that, 'The chairman detailed the provisions of the Acts of Parliament which the meeting would be invited to adopt in order to carry on within the premises recently purchase by Mr Fielden'.

In 1976 the building was altered to accommodate the Fleetwood Maritime Museum . The Museum remained there until 1991 when it moved to new premises in the former Town Hall on Queen's Terrace

== Bibliography ==
- Ramsbotton, Martin (2001), Fleetwood town trail: being a guided tour around some of the town's interesting historical sites and buildings, Hedgehog Historical Publications.
- Curtis, Bill (1986), Fleetwood: a Town is Born, Terence Dalton Limited.
