= Frederick Turner (Jesuit) =

English Jesuit priest, archivist, librarian and headmaster

Frederick Turner (27 October 1910 – 2001) was an English Jesuit priest, archivist, librarian and headmaster at Stonyhurst College.

== Birth ==
Frederick Joseph Turner was born on 27 October 1910 at Lytham St Annes, Lancashire of recusant stock, the only son of Joseph William Turner, a successful solicitor. An earlier member of his family had been Bishop William Turner, the first Bishop of Salford (1851-1872).

== Education ==
After his schooling at Stonyhurst College, Turner went to University College, Oxford, in 1929, and secured first-class honours in Mods and Greats. He entered the Jesuit novitiate at Manresa House, Roehampton, in 1932 and, after taking first vows in 1934, was sent to study philosophy at the Gregorian University in Rome, where the regime allowed only one bath a year and where his health quickly deteriorated. He continued his studies at Heythrop College, Oxfordshire.

Beginning in 1937 he spent three years teaching Classics at Beaumont College, Berkshire. In 1940 he returned to Heythrop for his theological studies and was ordained deacon in 1943 and priest three months later at St Wilfrid's, Preston. In 1940 he returned to Heythrop for his theological studies and was ordained deacon in 1943 and priest three months later at St Wilfrid's, Preston.

== Stonyhurst ==
In 1948, Father Turner began teaching Classics at Stonyhurst College. In 1952, he was named prefect of studies. From 1961-1963 he served as Headmaster. He returned to Beaumont until, in 1967, he came back to Stonyhurst, where he remained for the next 33 years. After an active teaching career, he was in 1971 appointed house librarian and archivist, which put him in charge of the school's four great libraries, one of which, the Museum, was demolished in 1974 to make way for Higher Line Common Room.
