= Chester Cathedral Library =

Library in Chester, Cheshire, England

- 53.192007051826856°N 2.89117780009896°W
- Location: Chester, England
- Established: 1541

Other information
- Affiliation: Chester Cathedral
- Website: chestercathedral.com/library/

Chester Cathedral Library is situated in three rooms in and around the cathedral in Chester, Cheshire, England. It has been in existence since the time of St Werburgh's Abbey, the predecessor of the cathedral. The library was previously housed mainly in the chapter house of the cathedral, then in a room above the former King's School. During the 2000s it was refurbished and partly rehoused. It is available for study and research, and is open for visits by organised groups.

== History ==
=== Early history ===
In 1541, at the time of the dissolution of the monasteries, St Werburgh's Abbey in Chester became a cathedral and the abbey library became the cathedral library. It is not known when the library originated, but it has been argued that it was in existence before the end of the 12th century. After the foundation of the cathedral the contents of the library continued to grow, although there is little evidence of activity between 1613 and the early part of the 18th century. The chapter house had been restored in 1723 and the library was moved into it in 1728. During the previous year the library had been augmented by the purchase of the library of the late Prebendary Thane, consisting of around 500 volumes, at the cost of £105 (equivalent to £20,000 in 2023). About the same time the library received a bequest from the will of Dean James Arderne, consisting of a lump sum of £500 (equivalent to £94,000 in 2023), and income from an annual rent of over £67 (equivalent to £13,000 in 2023).

There is evidence of increased activity in the library in the early 19th century. In the late 1830s many of the books were rebound, in 1838 Revd William Harrison was appointed as librarian and the regulations regarding use of the library were strengthened. There were about 1,100 books in the library in 1849 but they were said to be neglected. When Nathaniel Hawthorne visited the library in 1853 he found it to be "in a discreditable state of decay". Following this, further attention was given to the library. It was enlarged between 1867 and 1885 during the time of Dean Howson. Between 1896 and 1898 new bookcases with sloping tops, designed by the architect Edward Ould, replaced the old high bookcases. A further reorganisation took place in 1920, which included housing elsewhere some of the books that were overflowing from the library.

In 1960 the King's School moved from its site in Northgate Street, adjacent to the cathedral, and the large room on its first floor was adapted to form the main library (then known as the Upper Library). There was little further activity until the early 1980s, at which time the contents of the library were housed in five separate sites around the cathedral. By the middle of the decade, most of the contents of the chapter house, both books and bookcases, were covered in mould. Since that time there has been an extensive programme of repair, cleaning, restoration, rebinding and re-cataloguing.

=== Refurbishment and re-opening ===
Around 2000 it was decided to build a new Song School for the cathedral choir and while this was being built the choir would be using the Upper Library. In order to accommodate the contents of the library during this time, and to provide increased capacity for the future, two rooms elsewhere were refurbished for the purpose. These were a long room above St Anselm's Chapel and an adjoining room. Access to the rooms was improved by building a new staircase to replace the existing spiral staircase. This project was assisted by a grant of £50,000 from the Heritage Lottery Fund. The new Song School was opened in October 2003 and the choir moved out of the Upper Library. While the choir had been in occupation, additional bookcases had been acquired, including some from Knutsford Public Library, together with some display cases from John Rylands Library, Manchester. Work then took place to reorganise and refurbish the Upper Library, which was renamed the Exhibition Library, with the intention of re-opening it in 2007.

A special opening event took place on 10 February 2007. Professor Philip Alexander of Manchester University gave a talk about notable people associated with the cathedral, and this was accompanied by a display of books relating to the talk. The refurbished library was officially opened by the Duke of Westminster on 7 September.

== Notable contents ==
The most important work created by a monk of St Werburgh's Abbey was the Polychronicon, written in the 14th century by Ranulph Higden. A copy of this was given to the library in 1925 by the widow of Bishop Henry Luke Paget; she had paid £25 for it. This copy is now stored at the Cheshire Record Office for safety, as is a Book of Hours that was donated to the library in 1906. The library holds a copy of an English translation of the Polychronicon which was printed in London in the early 16th century. Also in the library is a two-volume Biblia Latina, which was printed in Cologne in 1477.

== Present use ==
The library is housed in three rooms; the Exhibition Library in the former King's School, a room above St Anselm's Chapel, and a room adjoining this in the northwest corner of the nave of the cathedral. The contents can be used for research but are not available to borrow. Most of the books are theological, but there are books on other subjects, including the county of Cheshire and the Diocese of Chester. Visits for groups can be arranged by appointment.
