= The Word (library) =

Library in South Shields, England

Coordinates: 54.9971°N 1.4384°W

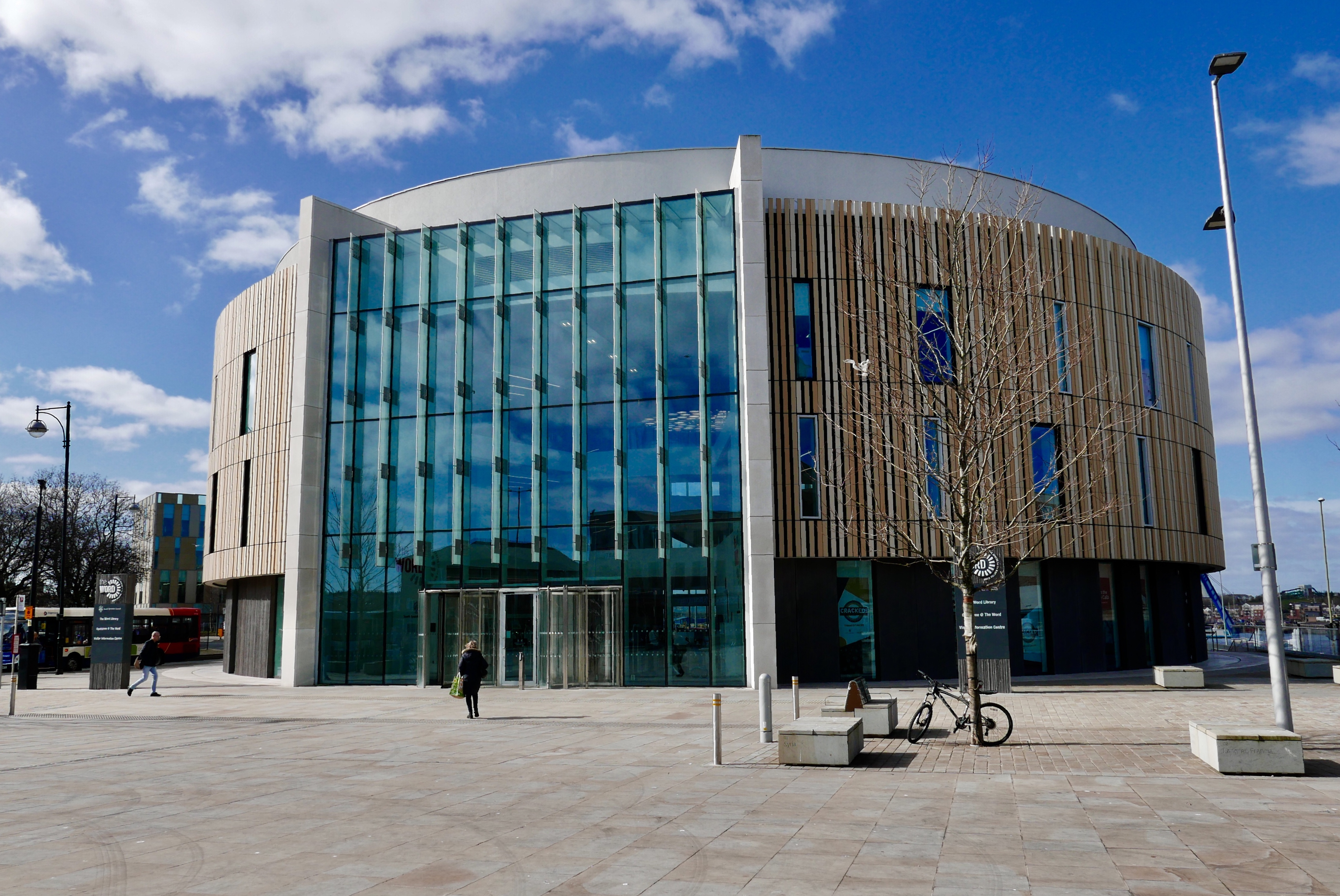
- Location: South Shields
- Type: Public library
- Established: October 2016

Other information
- Website: https://theworduk.org

The Word, National Centre for the Written Word is a library and community centre in South Shields, England.

== Location ==
The building is located in South Shields market place, on the south bank of the River Tyne. It is near to the centre of town and also to the Shields Ferry landing. The Grade I listed Old Town Hall is adjacent, and St Hilda's Church is also nearby.

== History ==
The library was opened on 19 October 2016 and marked the completion of the first phase of the local authority South Tyneside Council's development plan "South Shields 365". It was designed by architects FaulknerBrowns. The main contractor was Bowmer + Kirkland.

The official opening ceremony was led by Councillor Alan Smith, the Mayor of South Tyneside who cut the ribbon. It opened to the public on 22 October 2016.

== Amenities ==
The building houses several amenities apart from being a public library:

- FabLab, creative area with 3D printer and laser cutting. This was funded by BT.
- StoryWorld, a room for story-telling.
- Computer games area
- Exhibition space, featuring different topics.
