= Walsall Central Library =

Public library in Walsall, West Midlands, England

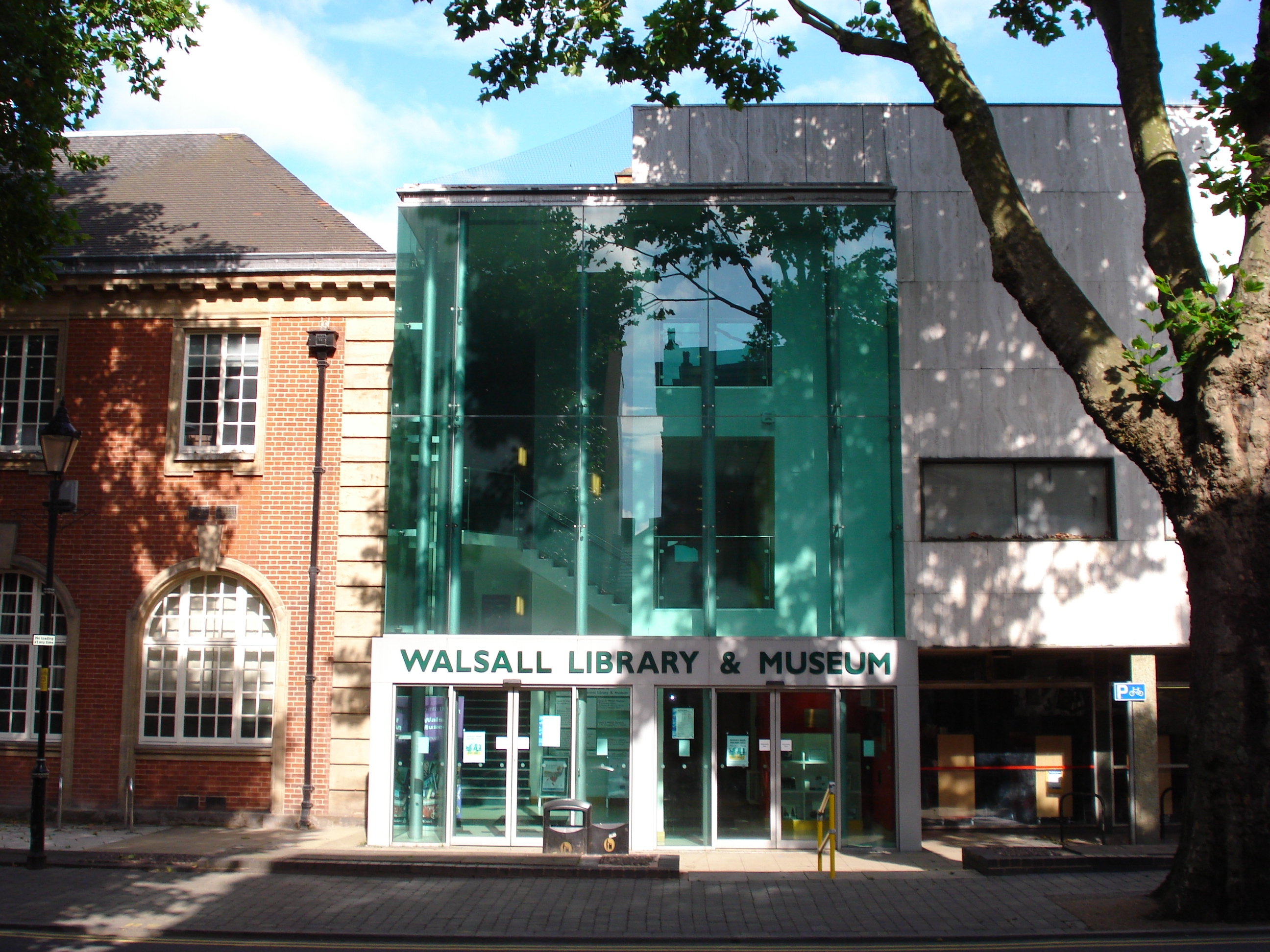
- 52°35′10″N 1°58′44″W
- Location: Walsall, West Midlands, United Kingdom
- Type: Public library
- Established: 1906
- Branches: 7

Other information
- Website: www.lovelibrarieswalsall.co.uk

Walsall Central Library is a public library situated in the town centre of Walsall in the West Midlands, in the United Kingdom. It is part of 7 branch libraries and a mobile library service, and was officially opened to the public in 1906. The Central Library comprises a lending library, reference library, learning centre and children's library. It holds information in various formats and languages: books, journals, newspapers and magazines, and there are computer facilities available.

== History ==
The first subscription based library in Walsall was opened on 14 November 1800. It was set up in the home of the Rev. Thomas Bowen and was based in Rushall Street Walsall. In 1813 the library moved to a new location at a stationer's shop called 'Valentine and Throsby' in the High Street, Walsall.

In 1831 St Matthew's Hall was built and became another subscription based public library. The building cost £1,600 to construct and consisted of a reading room (which held over 3,000 books) and a news room. Due to a lack of paying users the building fell into disrepair. All the book stock was relocated to a local printing shop on The Bridge, called J.R.Robinson. When the Free Libraries Act in 1859 was passed (Walsall being the third town in the country to adopt this new Act) a 'Walsall Free Library' was created. Lichfield was among the other 3 towns to first adopt this new legislation. This new library was allocated money from the council rates and was additionally supported by voluntary subscriptions. Its new location was in Goodall Street, near the Assembly Room, and contained approximately 12,300 books. The Italianate two-storey building designed by Nichols & Morgan of West Bromwich consisted of "entrance hall with glass screen to form vestibule, library with gallery, a very large and admirably lighted reading room, committee and other rooms".

Over the following years the library expanded to include a small saddlery museum and an art gallery. Further developments occurred in 1900 when the Scottish born American philanthropist Andrew Carnegie funded the new build of a new Walsall library with a donation of £8,000.

Walsall Central Library opened its doors on 24 July 1906 in Lichfield Street, Walsall. The building was designed by the architect J.S. Gibson who also designed the Council House in Walsall. It took two years to build and was opened by Alderman W. Hughes chairman of the Free Library and Art Gallery Committee. Alderman Hughes unlocked the front door with an inscribed silver key. A programme and souvenir was produced to celebrate the opening of the new library.

== Expansion ==
In 1965 an extension was added to the Walsall Central library building. This gave space for a gallery containing the Garman Ryan collection, and was called the E.M.Flint Gallery after the chairman of the Library and Art Gallery Committee. A new children's and music library was also added to the building. In 1999 the Garman Ryan collection moved to Walsall's New Art Gallery. This enabled the Reference Library to relocate from the ground floor to the second floor. A separate area was created within the reference library to become a dedicated learning centre. In 2001 work was carried out to install a new passenger lift and library entrance linking the two parts of the building together. This allowed for the lending library to expand through to the vacated reference library area. The children's library was also refurbished as part of the improvement programme, and the main library entrance was altered to include a glass atrium for improved accessibility.

== Little Eva ==
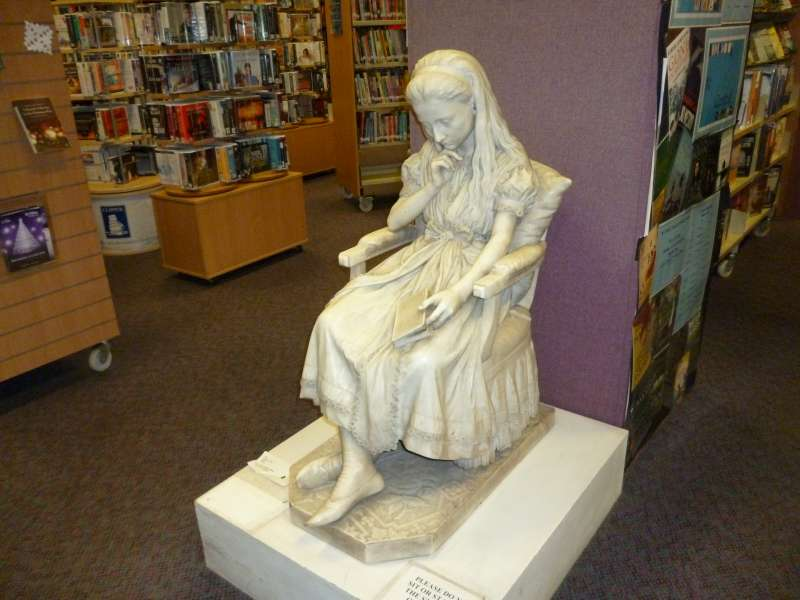
Little Eva statue

The statue entitled "Little Eva" or also known as "Eva St. Clair" was created by the sculptor Lot Torelli in 1870 and displayed at the Centennial Exposition in Philadelphia 1876. It is currently situated in the lending library. Once situated at the foot of the stairs in the old entrance to the building, it had a temporary move to the New Art Gallery whilst the refurbishment of the Central Library was taking place. Speculation surrounded her identity as being that of Alice in Wonderland, but after investigation the sculpture was confirmed as Little Eva, a character from the book Uncle Tom's Cabin. She was originally purchased from the collection of Sir George Trevelyan of Welcome Manor, Stratford. In 1932 Mrs Eileen Roper of Lichfield Road, Walsall donated the statue to Walsall Central Library in memory of her husband, W.H. Roper who was a former tradesman.
