= East Finchley Library =

Public library in Barnet, Greater London, England

Coordinates: 51°35′38″N 0°10′04″W

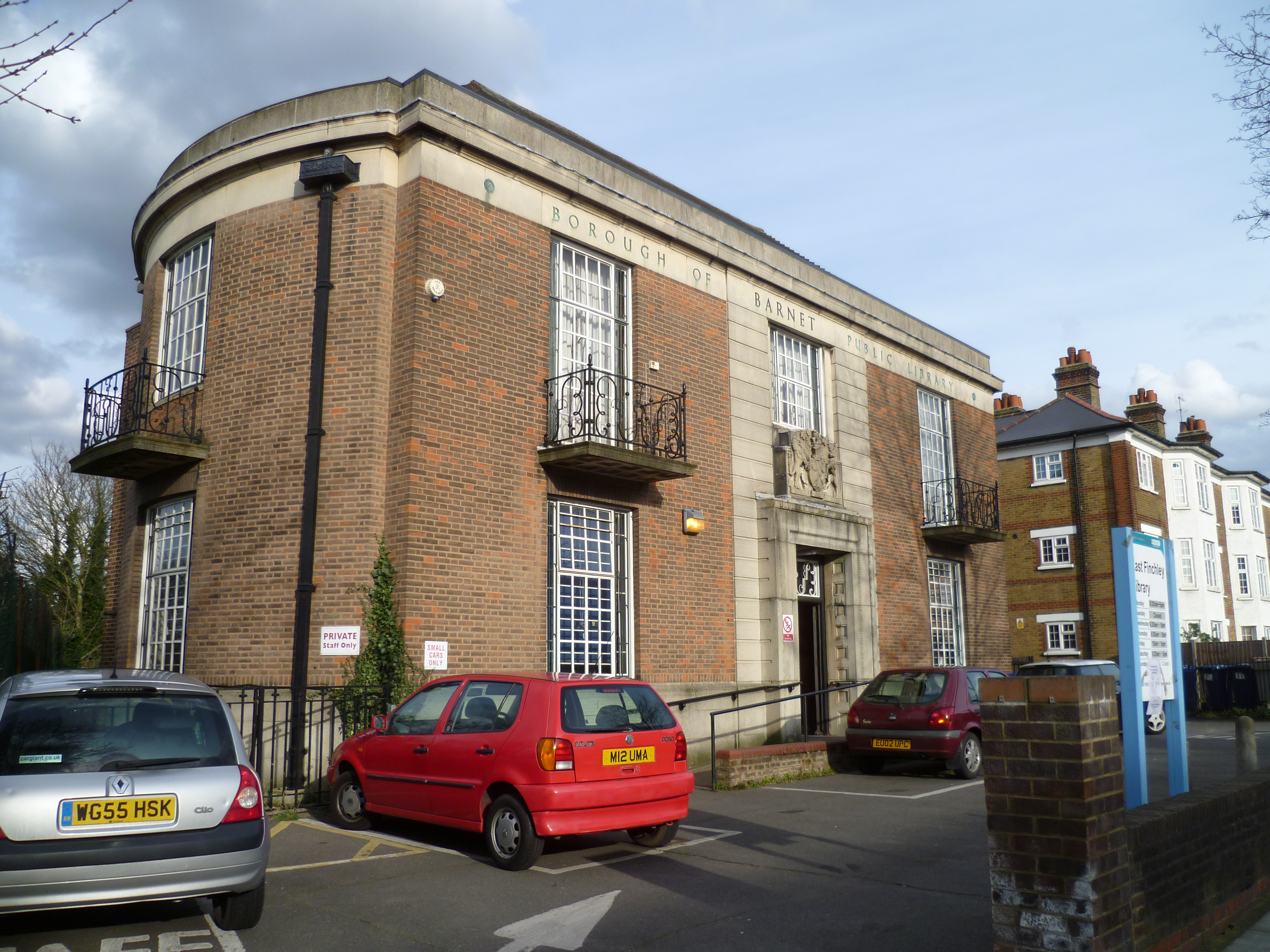
East Finchley Library

East Finchley Library is a grade II listed library at 226 High Road in East Finchley, London. It was built in 1938 to a design by Percival T. Harrison, the Borough of Finchley architect and engineer, assisted by C.M. Bond.

== Gallery ==
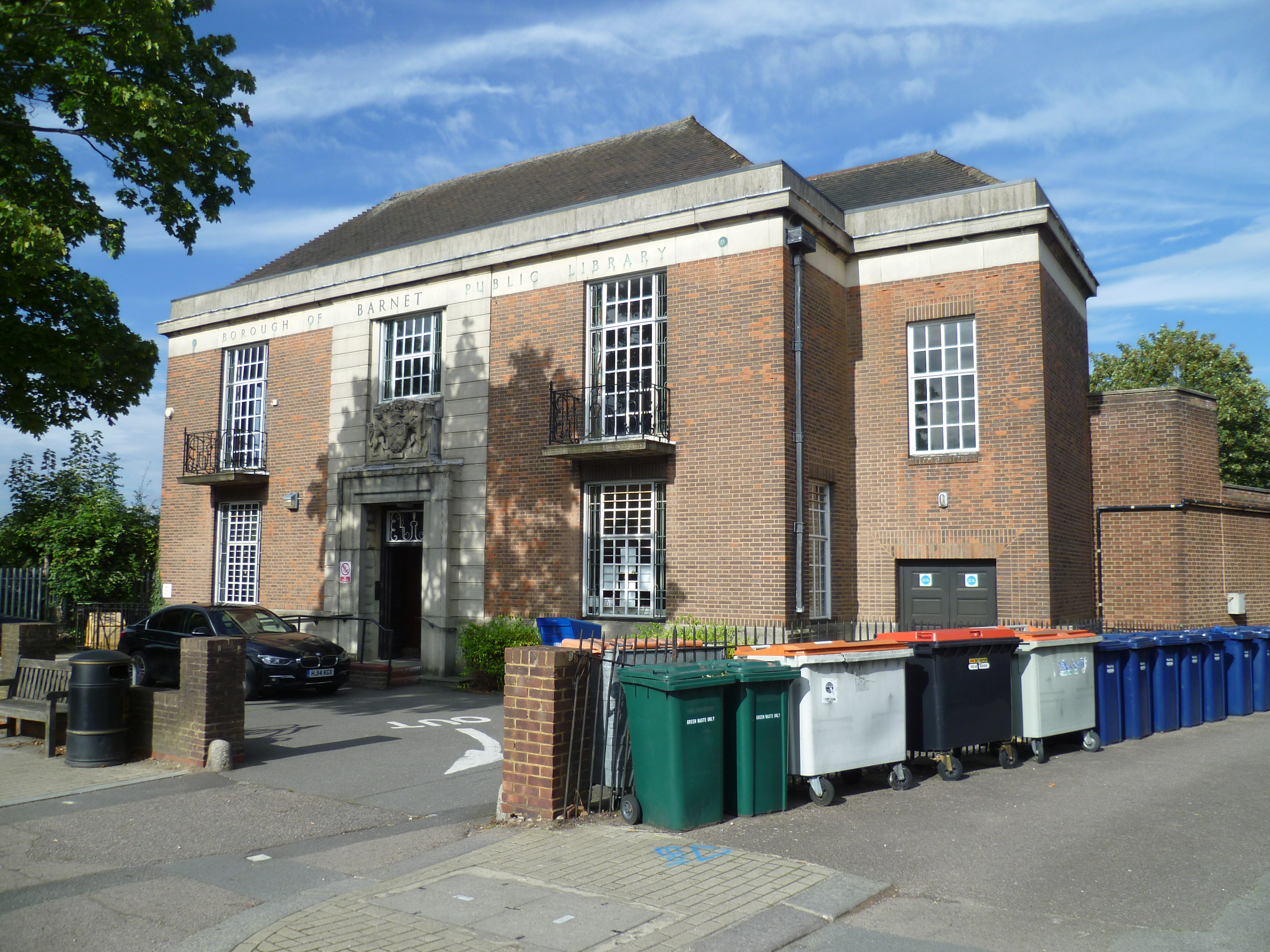
From the High Road.

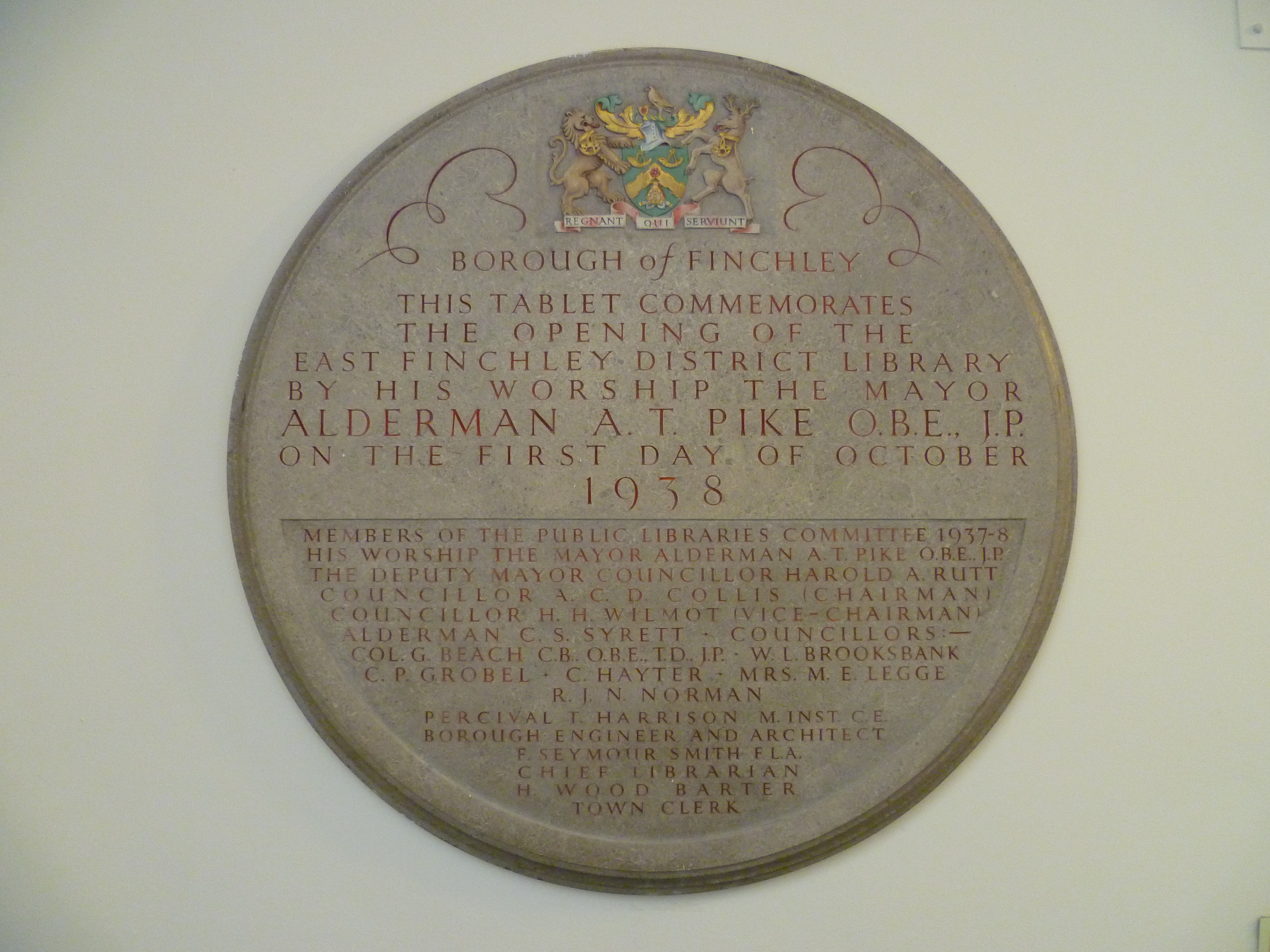
1938 opening plaque.

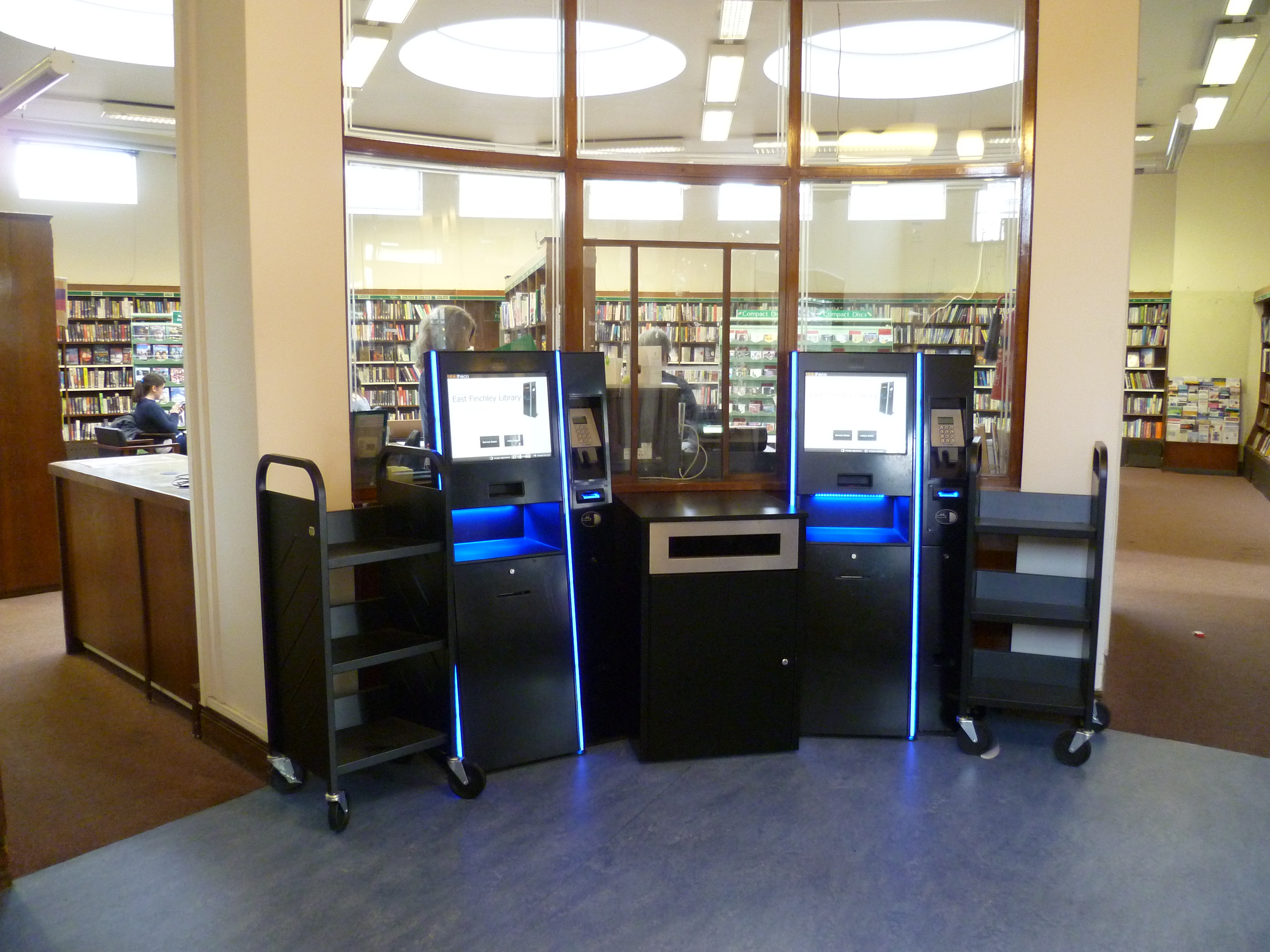
Interior view.

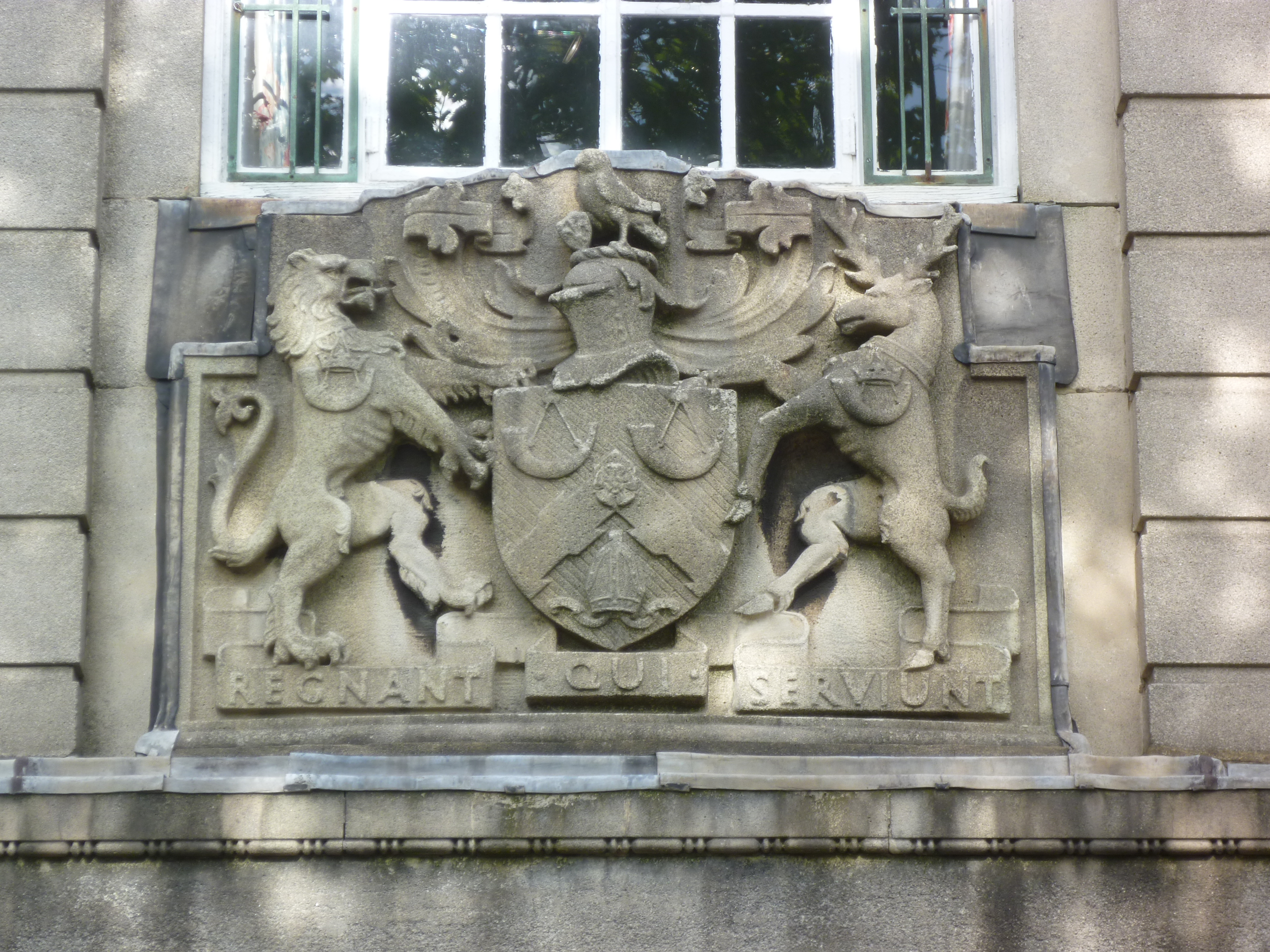
Arms of the former Borough of Finchley.
