= Thimblemill Library =

Library in Smethwick, West Midlands, England

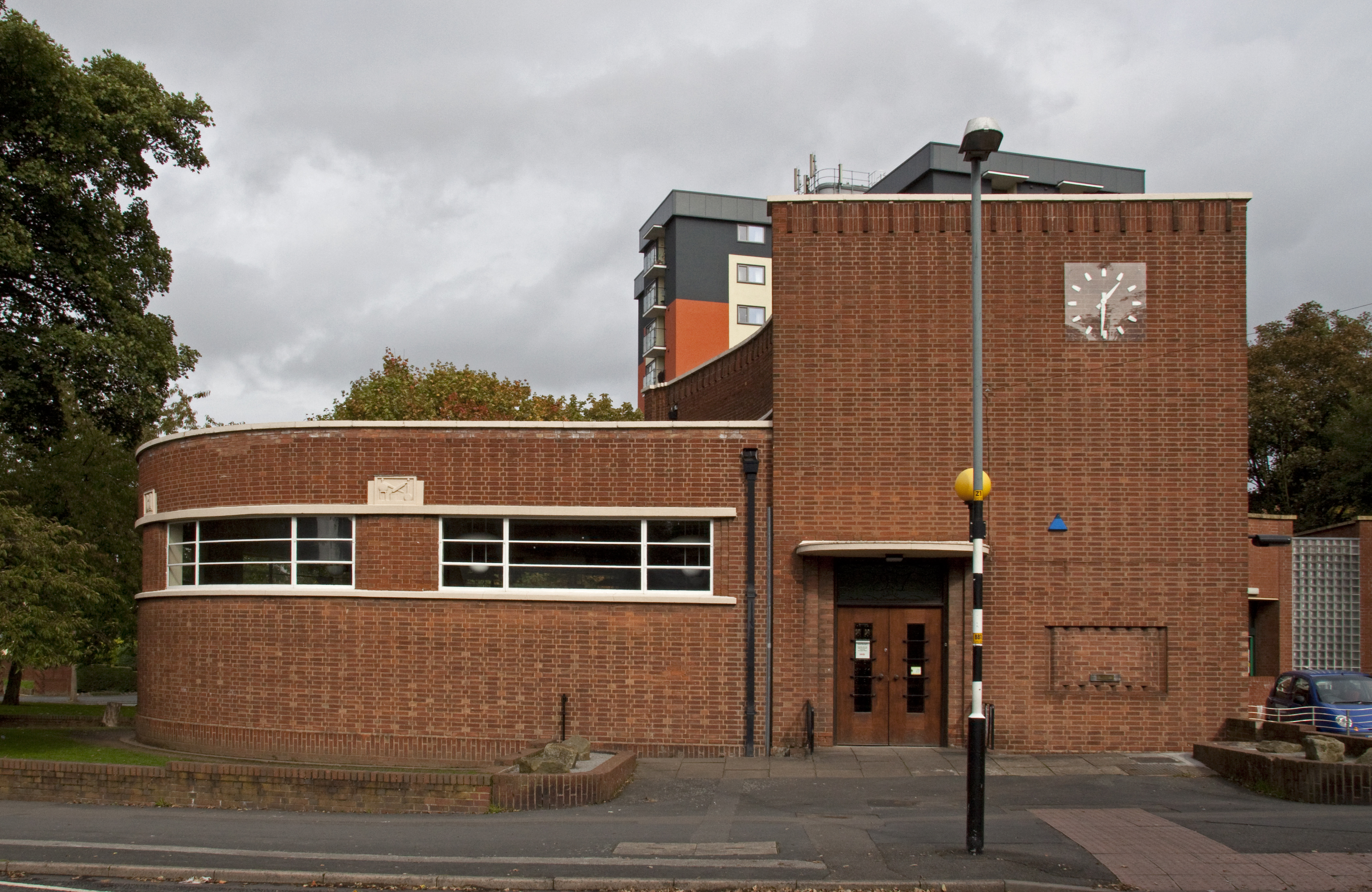
- Interactive map of the Thimblemill Library area

General information
- Status: Open
- Architectural style: Moderne
- Location: Beakes Road, Smethwick, England
- Coordinates: 52.48160°N 1.97649°W
- Completed: 1937
- Renovated: 2008

Technical details
- Material: Brick

Design and construction
- Architect: Chester Button
- Designations: Grade II listed

Thimblemill Library is located in Smethwick, in the Metropolitan Borough of Sandwell. It was built in 1937 and designed by Smethwick Borough engineer Roland Fletcher and Chester Button, an architect.

It is built in brick in the Moderne style and was given Grade II listed building status in March 2003, legally protecting it from unauthorised alteration or demolition. The English Heritage list entry describes the building as "Warley Branch Library, Smethwick".

The building, at the junction of Beakes Road and Thimblemill Road, was renovated and extended in 2008. It offers a modern range of digital services and community space.

It is named after a nearby former watermill called the Thimble Mill.
