= Wiltshire Library and Information Service =

Coordinates: 51.3165°N 2.2098°W

- Type: Public libraries
- Legal status: Local government
- Headquarters: Libraries & Heritage HQ, County Hall, Bythesea Road, Trowbridge, Wilts BA14 8BS
- Region served: Wiltshire
- Members: c. 215,000 registered members
- Parent organization: Wiltshire Council
- Staff: c. 170
- Volunteers: c. 600
- Website: Wiltshire.Gov.UK

Wiltshire Library and Information Service is a county-wide network of public libraries based in Trowbridge, Wiltshire, England. It is service of Wiltshire Council, with the strapline "Love Reading, Love Libraries".

There are 31 public libraries and 5 mobile libraries, including one which specifically visits residential homes. The smallest ten libraries are still stocked with books and funded by the council, but are staffed by volunteers. Volunteers have also helped extend opening hours in some medium-sized libraries.

== Facilities ==
The libraries offer a selection of:

- Adult fiction books
- Adult non fiction books
- Large print books (almost 30,000)
- Books on cassette and CD (over 20,000)
- Children's fiction books
- Children's non fiction books, including homework support
- A selection of books for teenagers
- Free access to the internet and office software
- Collections and advice on health in many large libraries in partnership with the National Health Service
- Support for reading groups across the county, including longer loan periods and free requests
- Taster sessions in computers and IT for free - associated with Race Online 2012 and BBC First Click
- The interlibrary loan service can get books and journal articles from libraries across the region, country, and world if required

== Other information services ==
The libraries can also provide access to:

- The full reference and information services offered by Wiltshire Library and Information Service, as well as access to a range of online information services
- Community information via the Wiltshire Clubs and Organisations Directory
- Local history information via colleagues at the Wiltshire and Swindon History Centre and through the Wiltshire Studies catalogue and the Wiltshire Community History website which includes detailed information on individual communities.

== Resources and events ==
Library users can search the library catalogue and reserve items they wish to borrow and have them delivered from any Wiltshire library to their nearest library. They can also check their borrower record and renew items.

In 2008 and 2009 promotional events included those featuring aliens, monsters, characters from Star Wars and daleks from Doctor Who at Chippenham Library, Corsham Library, Calne Library, Devizes Library, Salisbury Library, and Bradford on Avon Library. More than 2,000 people attended the event at Chippenham, and more than 3,000 attended at Salisbury.
