= Pilkington Library =

Academic library at Loughborough University, UK

Coordinates: 52.763°N 1.237°W

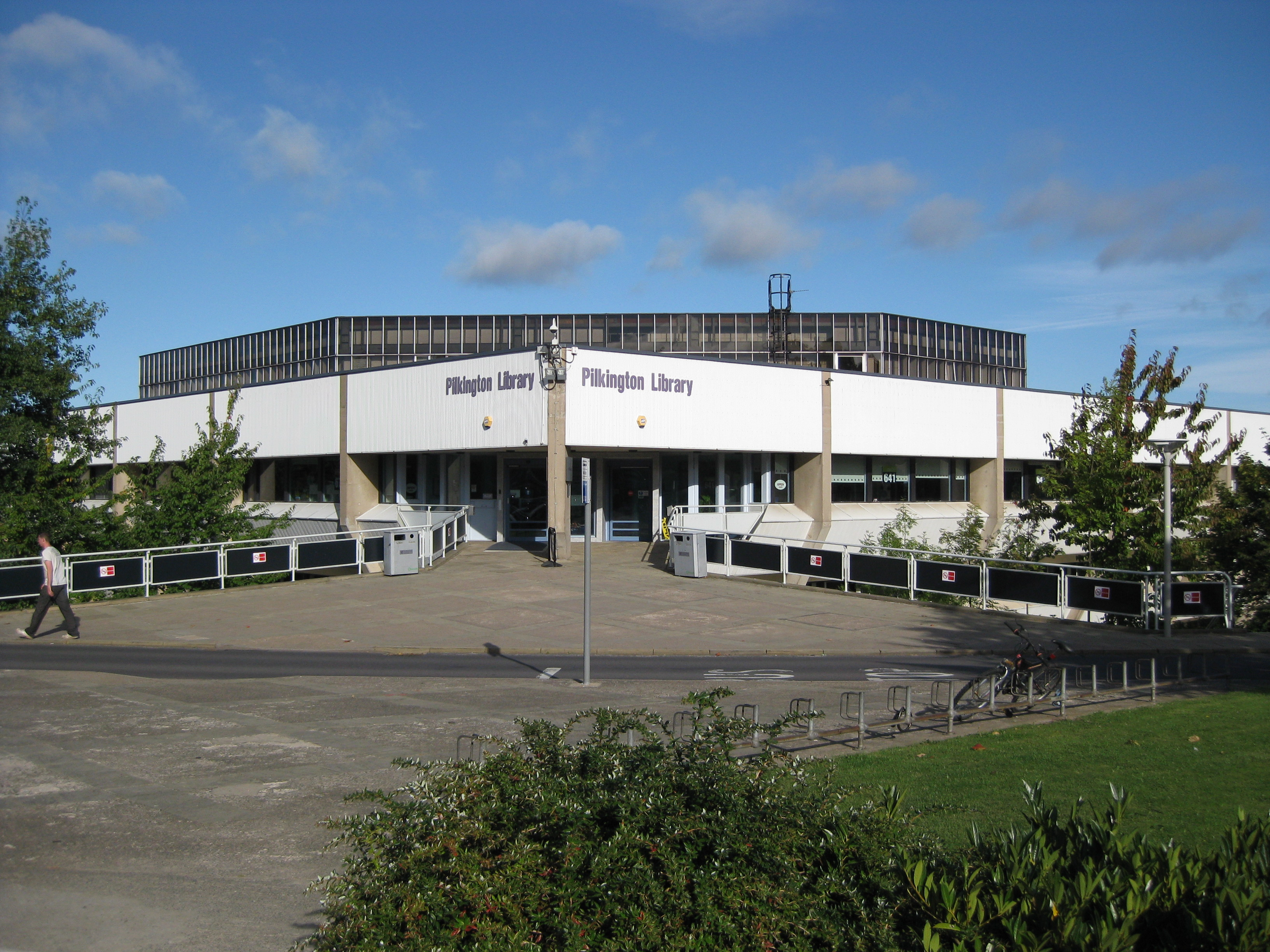
- Location: Loughborough University Campus, Loughborough, England
- Type: Academic library
- Established: 1980

Collection
- Items collected: books, journals, newspapers, magazines, sound and music recordings, and manuscripts
- Size: over 600,000 books; 90,000 bound serials and access to over 10,000 e- journals

Access and use
- Members: Loughborough University (and some other groups on application)

Other information
- Director: Emma Walton (Acting University Librarian)
- Website: http://www.lboro.ac.uk/library/

The Pilkington Library is the academic library at Loughborough University, situated in the West Park of the university campus at Loughborough, Leicestershire, in the East Midlands of England. It is named after Lord Pilkington.

Built to an unusual design on an unusual site in the West Park area of the campus, the library building is immediately adjacent to Village Park. As it is adjacent to the University's more recent Elvyn Richards halls, its Combined Heat and Power plant can be used to cool the library building with otherwise wasted heat.

The Pilkington Library opened in 1980 as the main library to the then Loughborough University of Technology; the university library had previously been located in the Herbert Manzoni building which provided around a quarter of the capacity of the new facility, with the Fairbairn Library (the Loughborough College of Art and Design Library before the merger of LCAD - renamed LUSAD post merger - and the University in 1998), located at the far extremity of the campus adjacent to the RNIB College and Loughborough College. At a later date this building was closed when the library stock was re-located to the Pilkington Library.

== Architecture ==
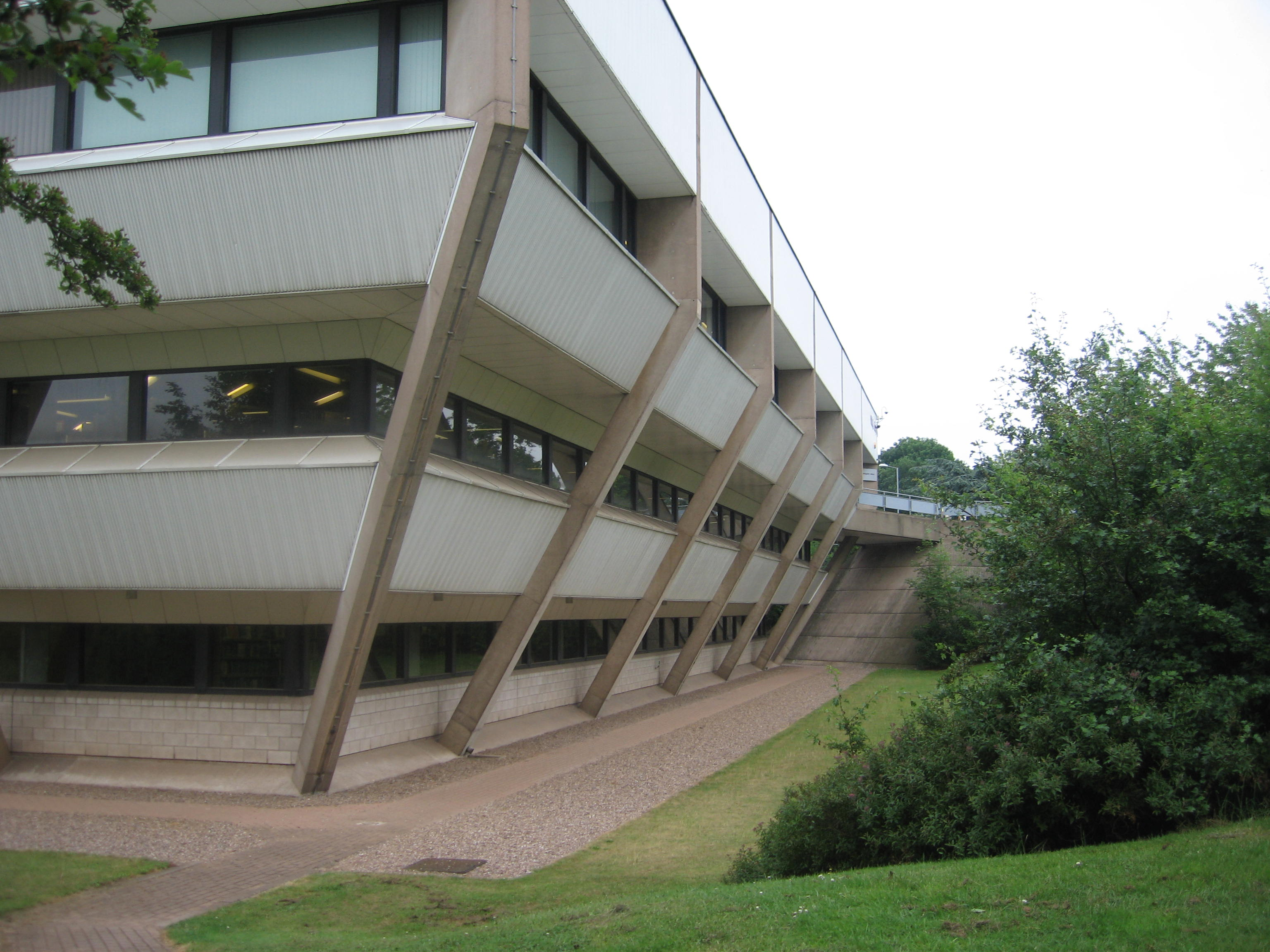
Pilkington Library showing floor arrangement and entrance

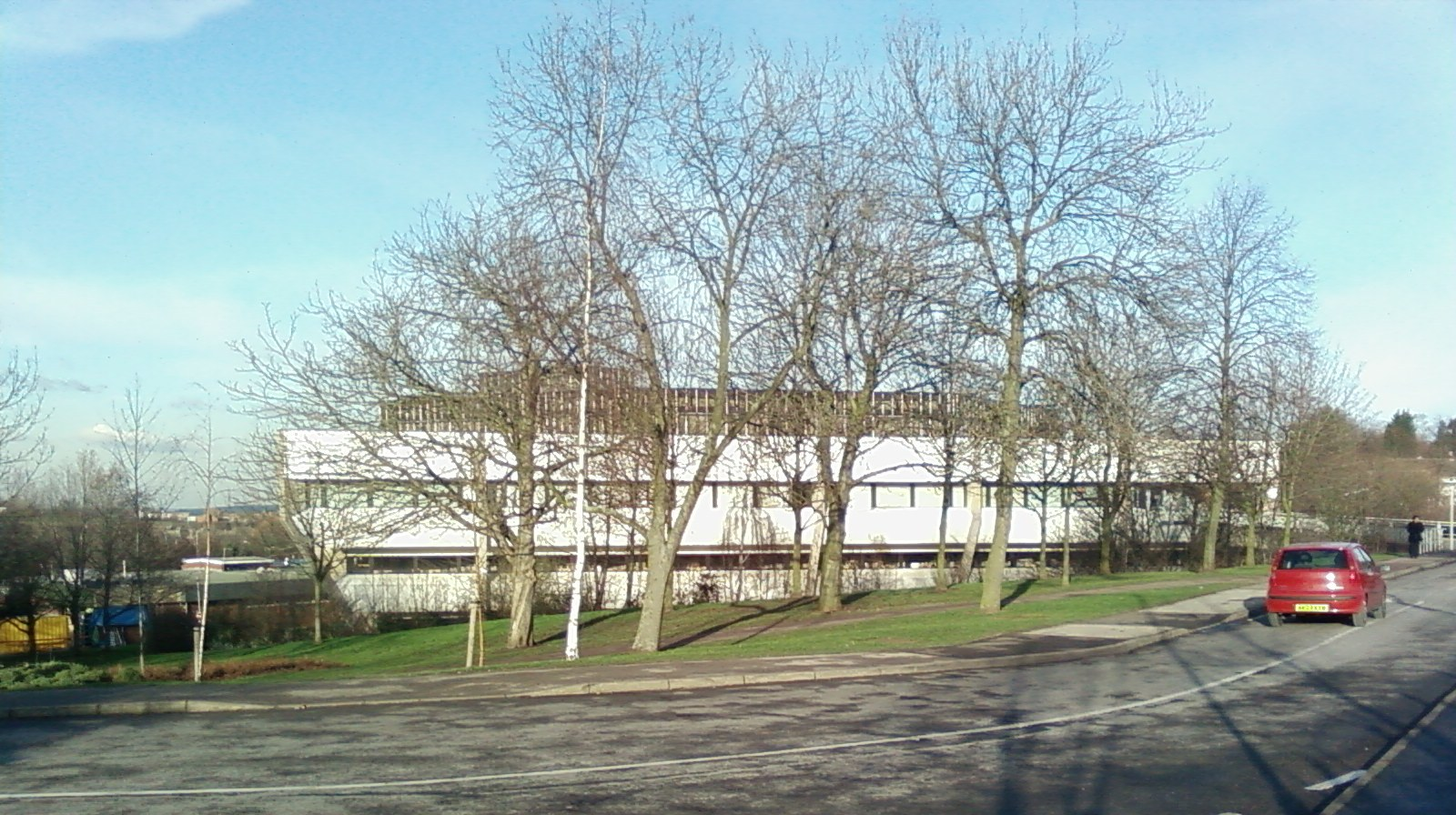
Pilkington Library from the West Park side of the building

The building unusually has the floor with the smallest area at the base of the structure, followed by another slightly larger, these first two floors being known as Level 1 and Level 2 and primarily holding book stock, Level 3 is slightly larger again and contains the entrance, accessed via a link bridge, a café, limited book and periodical stock, a number of administrative offices and Open3 an informal study area. Level 4 contains a University academic department. The three Library floors amount to 7,777 square metres (83,710 ft^{2}).

For a library designed and built at a time of major change to the criteria used by the then University Grants Committee the new library was not greatly affected by the Atkinson Report which set out the UGC's new expectations in terms of size, layout and flexibility. The then Librarian, Professor Tony Evans, wrote in an article in the International Association of Technological University Libraries Proceedings that Atkinson's restrictions on collection size were not a problem in an institution with a relatively small book stock and the only difficulties encountered with the UGC arose from the proposal to house the Library School on top of the library building, which were later overcome.

As a result of a story published in Label Magazine (published by the students' union) as an April fool there is an ongoing urban myth that the Library building is sinking due to the weight of the books contained within it not having been taken into account at the design stage, although no such errors or movement have ever occurred.

== Collections ==
The library has over 600,000 books and 90,000 journals housed primarily on Levels 1 and 2 of the building, which are organised such that the elements of the collection particularly relevant to the University's science and technology students, 500-699 in the Dewey Decimal Classification system, are housed together on Level 1 and the remaining stock (Dewey classes 000-499 & 700-999) primarily arts, humanities, social science and computing are on Level 2.

=== David Lewis Collection ===
The David Lewis collection is named after Dr David Lewis who was Cataloguing Manager in the Library from 1966 to 2004, and formed and managed the collection from items acquired by the University and its predecessors since around 1930. Made up of around 3000 books and journals the collection holds items considered in need of secure storage as a result of their age, value, scarcity, physical condition or other factors; it contains a wide range of materials, with the history of town and country planning, history of sport, history of science and engineering, 18th and 19th century English literature, Leicestershire history and topography along with architecture, art and design being particular strengths.

== Loughborough University Archives ==
Level 1 of the Library also house the University Archives which hold written, photographic and other material relating to the university and its predecessor colleges including official minutes, administrative papers, student enrollment records, prospectuses and other publications. There is a fine series of engineering drawings and photographs dating from the First World War when Loughborough Technical Institute was an Instructional Factory for the Ministry of Munitions.

Among material donated by former staff and students, principal collections include those of Norman Swindin (1880–1976), chemical engineer and Honorary Reader in Chemical Engineering; Dan Maskell (1908–92), tennis player and commentator; Harry Hopthrow (1896–1992), student, soldier and mechanical engineer; and Commander FW Collins (1905–89), athletics coach and organiser of the 1948 Olympic Torch Relay.
