= Lifeboat Monument, St Annes =

Memorial to 1886 lifeboat disaster

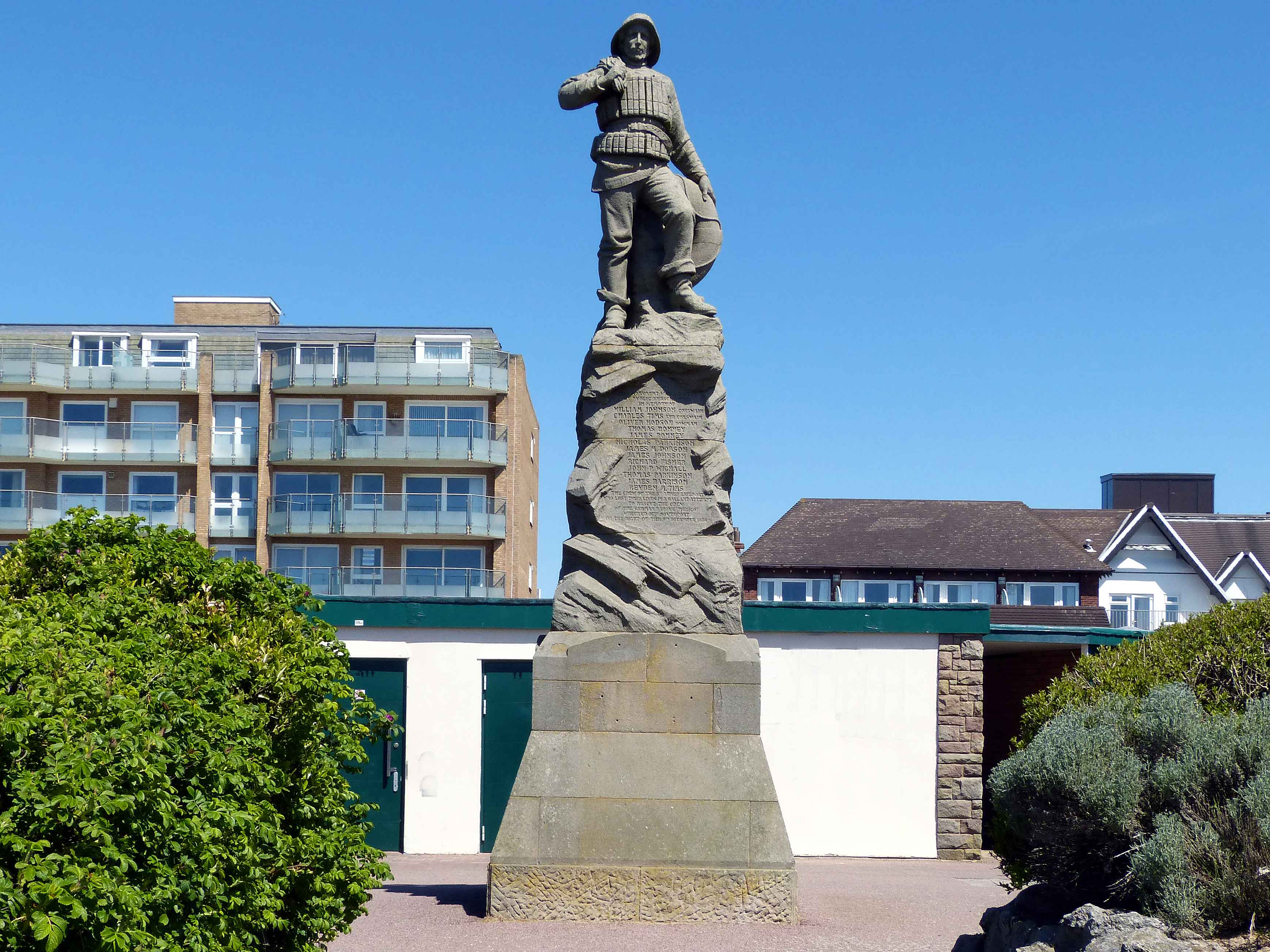
- Interactive map of Lifeboat Monument, St Annes
- Location: South Promenade, St Annes, Lancashire, England
- Coordinates: 53°44′56″N 3°02′02″W
- Designer: W. B. Rhind
- Material: Sandstone on an ashlar plinth
- Opening date: 23 May 1888

Listed Building – Grade II
- Official name: Lifeboat monument approximately 100 metres south east of St Annes Pier
- Designated: 15 February 1993
- Reference no.: 1196340

The Lifeboat Monument, St Annes, stands on South Promenade, St Annes, Fylde, Lancashire, England. It commemorates the death of 13 lifeboatmen from St Annes who were lost in the attempt to rescue the crew of the German barque Mexico that had been driven into a sandbank in a gale in December 1886. The lifeboat from Southport also lost 14 of its 16 man crew in the disaster. The monument depicts a lifeboatman looking out to sea and standing on a rock-like plinth. It is recorded in the National Heritage List for England as a designated Grade II listed building.

== History ==
In a severe gale on 9 December 1886, the Mexico, a German barque, was driven onto the Horse Bank, a sandbank off Ainsdale, near Southport. Three lifeboats were launched to come to her rescue: Laura Janet from St Annes, Eliza Fernley from Southport, and Charles Biggs from Lytham. The crew of the Mexico were rescued by the Lytham lifeboat, but the other two lifeboats capsized. All thirteen of the crew of the St Annes lifeboat were lost, and only two of the sixteen members of the Southport lifeboat crew survived. It was the worst disaster in the history of the Royal National Lifeboat Institution.

Following the disaster, John Unwin, the mayor of Southport, set up a Disaster Fund, which raised £31,000. Most of this was used to help the dependants of the men lost, but in January 1887 the Fund allowed each of the three local committees a sum of £200 to erect monuments to commemorate the disaster. The St Annes committee commissioned W. B. Rhind to design a monument. It was unveiled on St Annes Promenade on 23 May 1888 by John Talbot Clifton.

== Description ==
The monument is constructed in sandstone. It has an ashlar tapering plinth approximately 2 metres (6 ft 7 in) square and 2 metres (6 ft 7 in) high. On the plinth is a pedestal with the appearance of a rock, about 3 metres (9 ft 10 in) high. Standing on the pedestal is a larger than life-size figure of a lifeboatman. The lifeboatman looks out to sea. On the south side of the monument is a panel inscribed with the names of those who were lost. Underneath the names is the following inscription:

THE CREW OF THE ST ANNES LIFEBOAT
WHO LOST THEIR LIVES IN A GALLANT ATTEMPT
TO RESCUE THE CREW
OF THE GERMAN BARQUE "MEXICO"
WRECKED OFF SOUTHPORT
ON THE NIGHT OF THE 9TH DECEMBER 1886

== Appraisal ==
The memorial was designated as a Grade II listed building on 15 February 1993. Grade II is the lowest of the three grades of listing and is applied to "buildings of national importance and special interest".

== Related monuments ==
Three other memorials were commissioned to commemorate the event, two in Southport and one in Lytham, all of which are designated at Grade II. In Southport Cemetery is the Lifeboat Memorial, which is in the form of a tomb chest, and on the Promenade is the Monumental Obelisk, which commemorates other events in addition to the lifeboat disaster. The Lytham Memorial stands in the churchyard of St Cuthbert's Church and has the form of a pinnacled tabernacle.

== See also ==
- Listed buildings in Saint Anne's on the Sea
- Southport and St Anne's lifeboats disaster
