= Monumental Obelisk, Southport =

Memorial to 1886 lifeboat disaster

Coordinates: 53.64850°N 3.00964°W

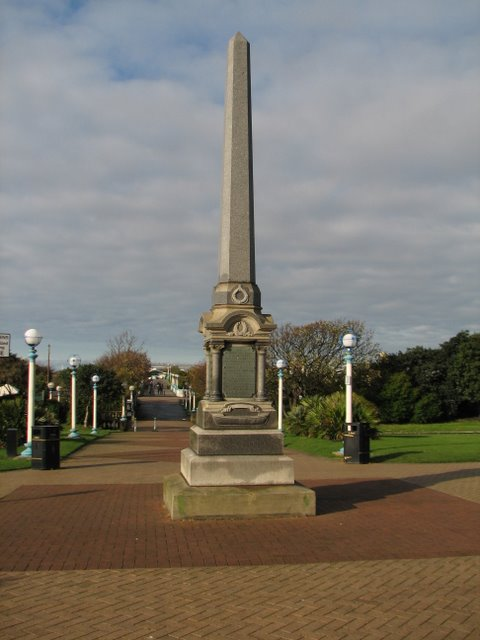
Monumental Obelisk, Southport

The Monumental Obelisk, Southport, stands on the Promenade in Southport. Merseyside, England. It commemorates a number of events, mainly relating to the work of the Southport lifeboats, and in particular the loss of fourteen lifeboatmen when their boat capsized in 1886. The monument was designed by Thomas Robinson, and is constructed in granite. It is recorded in the National Heritage List for England as a designated Grade II listed building.

== History ==
In a severe gale on 9 December 1886, the Mexico, a German barque, was driven on to the Horse Bank, a sandbank off Ainsdale, near Southport. Three lifeboats were launched to come to her rescue, Eliza Fernley from Southport, Laura Janet from St Annes, and Charles Biggs from Lytham. The crew from the Mexico were rescued by the Lytham lifeboat, but the other two lifeboats capsized. All thirteen of the crew of the St Annes lifeboat were lost, and only two of the sixteen members of the Southport lifeboat crew survived. It was the worst disaster in the history of the Royal National Lifeboat Institution.

Following the disaster, John Unwin, the mayor of Southport, set up a Disaster Fund, which raised £31,000. Most of this was used to help the dependants of the men lost, but some of the money was used to erect memorials to commemorate the men who lost their lives. In Southport the Lifeboat Memorial was built in the cemetery, and another memorial was built on the Promenade. This memorial is in the form of an obelisk, and in addition to commemorating the loss of the Eliza Fernley, it commemorates the launching of its successor in 1888, the Edith and Anne, the achievements of two earlier lifeboats, and the Golden Jubilee of Queen Victoria in 1887. The obelisk itself was obtained from Garden and Company in Aberdeen at a cost of £160. The memorial was designed by Thomas Robinson, who also acted as sculptor. The complete cost of the memorial was £219, and it was unveiled by Mayor Unwin on 28 June 1888.

== Description ==
The monument is constructed in grey granite. It stands on a base of three square steps, on which is a plinth in the form of a tabernacle. This has columns at the corners, and on each side is a bronze plaque. There are inscriptions on three of the plaques, the south side being blank. On top of the plinth is the obelisk, which has chamfered edges.

The inscription on the plaque on the north side includes the following:

THE 'ELIZA FERNLEY',
PRESENTED BY JOHN FERNLEY,
Esq. OF BIRKDALE
1874, SAVED THE CREWS OF NINE VESSELS
NUMBERING 53 LIVES
This lifeboat was capsized
in a gale, Dec. 9-10 1886
When Fourteen of her Heroic
Crew were Drowned. She was Replaced by the 'Mary Anna', 1886.

== Appraisal ==
The memorial was designated as a Grade II listed building on 29 July 1999. Grade II is the lowest of the three grades of listing and is applied to "buildings of national importance and special interest".

== Related monuments ==
The Lifeboat Memorial in Southport Cemetery is also listed at Grade II, as are the memorials in Lytham and St Annes. The memorial in Lytham is in the churchyard of St Cuthbert's Church and has the form of a pinnacled tabernacle. The St Annes memorial stands on the Promenade, and consists of a statue of a lifeboatman looking out to sea.

== See also ==
- Southport and St Anne's lifeboats disaster
- Listed buildings in Southport
