= St John's Church, Lytham =

Coordinates: 53.7369°N 2.9549°W

St John's Church
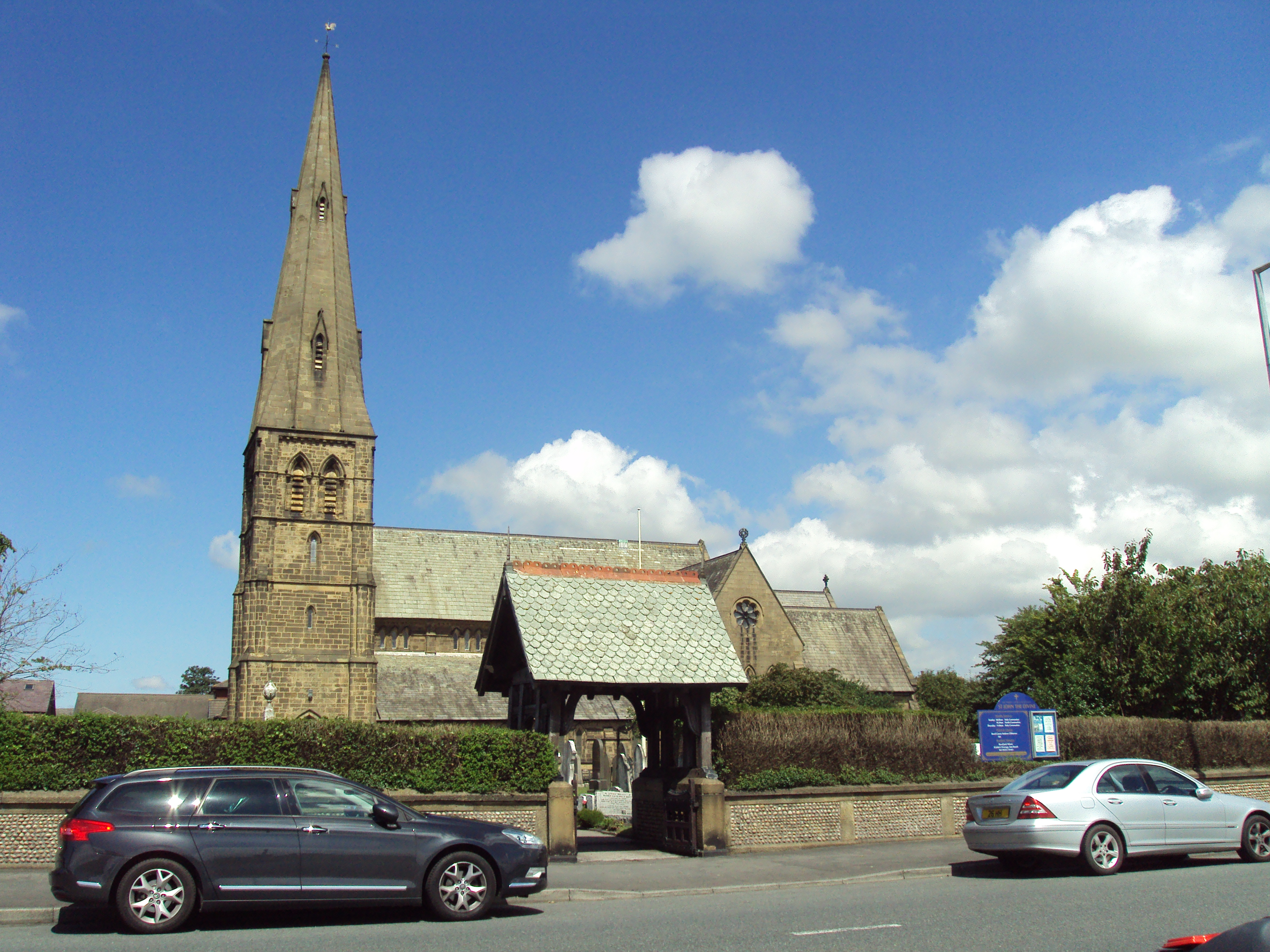
- St John's Church, Lytham, from the south, also showing the lych gate

- Location in Lytham St Annes
- OS grid reference: SD 371 272
- Location: East Beach, Lytham St Annes, Lancashire
- Country: England
- Denomination: Anglican
- Website: St John the Divine, Lytham

History
- Status: Parish church
- Consecrated: 11 September 1850

Architecture
- Functional status: Active
- Heritage designation: Grade II*
- Designated: 13 January 1971
- Architect: E. H. Shellard
- Architectural type: Church
- Style: Gothic Revival
- Groundbreaking: 1848
- Completed: 1857

Specifications
- Materials: Sandstone, slate roofs

Administration
- Province: York
- Diocese: Blackburn
- Archdeaconry: Lancaster
- Deanery: Kirkham
- Parish: St John, Lytham

Clergy
- Priest: Revd Jack Wixon

St John's Church is in East Beach, Lytham St Annes, Lancashire, England. It is an active Anglican parish church in the deanery of Kirkham, the archdeaconry of Lancaster, and the diocese of Blackburn. The church is recorded in the National Heritage List for England as a designated Grade II* listed building.

== History ==
The church was designed by E. H. Shellard, and was built in 1848–49. The site for the church was given by the Clifton family of Lytham Hall, and the church was paid for by public subscription. The church was consecrated on 11 September 1850. It was originally a mission church to St Cuthbert, Lytham, and became a parish in its own right in 1870. Extensions to the transepts and the chancel, also by Shellard, were made in 1856–57. In 1897 a lych gate was erected in memory of Revd T. G. Smart, vicar of the church, who had died in the previous year. In about 1920 a southeast chapel was remodelled as a war memorial chapel by Frank Mee.

== Architecture ==
=== Exterior ===
St John's is built in sandstone ashlar with Cumberland slate roofs, and is in Early English style. Its plan consists of a narrow nave with a clerestory, wide north and south aisles, north and south transepts, and a chancel with a south chapel and a north vestry. Attached to the south aisle is a four-stage tower with corner pilasters. There is a doorway in the bottom stage, narrow lancet windows in the second and third stages, and louvred lancet bell openings in the top stage. Surmounting the tower is a broach spire with two tiers of lucarnes. Along the sides of the aisles are buttresses and paired lancet windows, and the clerestory has pilasters and small triple lancets. In the west wall of the nave are buttresses and two tall lancets. The transepts each have three very narrow lancets with a circular window above them. The east window consists of three stepped lancets.

=== Interior ===
Inside the church are six-bay arcades carried on short cylindrical piers. The pews are box pews with the doors removed. The war memorial chapel has a screen by Ernest Flower. The memorial in the chapel is in the form of a stone arcade, designed by Cartmell and carved by J. Stother. The stained glass in the south aisle dates from 1911, and consists of a scheme of Northern saints by Geoffrey Webb. The glass in the war memorial window is by B. D. Walmsley. The builder of the two-manual pipe organ is unknown. Work has since been carried out on it by Conacher of Huddersfield in 1874 and 1888, and in 1950 by Hele of Plymouth. There is a ring of six bells, all cast in 1875 by Mears and Stainbank of the Whitechapel Bell Foundry.

== External features ==
The wall running along the south side of the churchyard and the lych gate are listed together at Grade II. The wall is in sandstone, is about 1 metre (3.3 ft) high, and stands on a chamfered plinth. It is decorated with panels containing courses of pebbles. The lych gate stands opposite the south door of the church. It is timber-framed on stone piers, and has a roof of fishscale slates and terracotta ridge tiles with wooden finials.

== Appraisal ==
The church was designated as a Grade II* listed building on 13 January 1971. Grade II* is the middle of the three grades granted by English Heritage, and is applied to buildings that are "particularly important buildings of more than special interest". The citation in the National Heritage List for England expresses the opinion that the church is among Shellard's best works. In the Buildings of England series, Hartwell and Pevsner state that "the interior shows Shellard at his best".

== See also ==
- Grade II* listed buildings in Lancashire
- Listed buildings in Lytham
