= Lifeboat Memorial, Southport =

Memorial to 1886 lifeboat disaster

Coordinates: 53.63528°N 2.99727°W

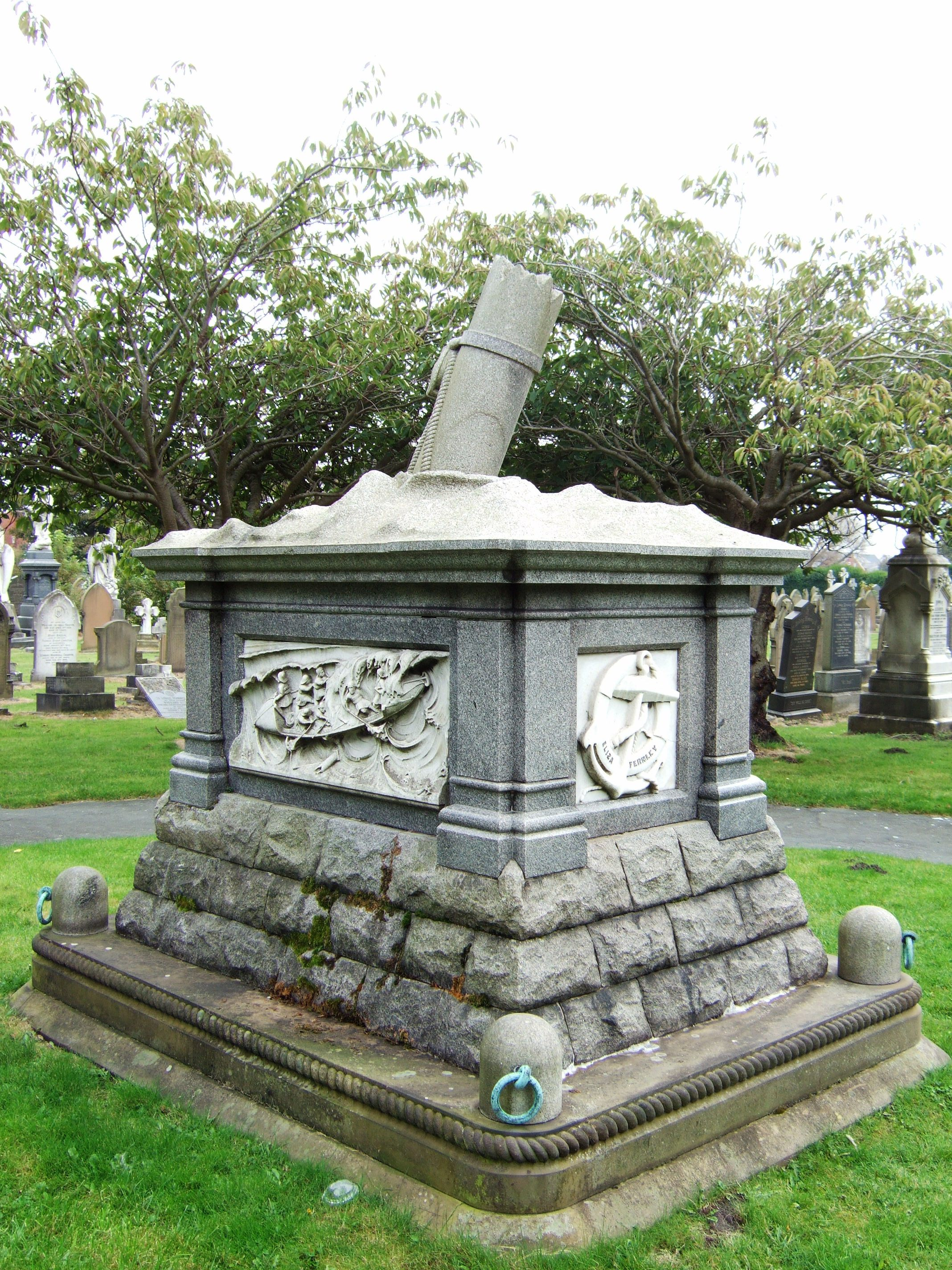
Southport Lifeboat Memorial

The Lifeboat Memorial, Southport, occupies a central position in Southport Cemetery, Cemetery Road, Southport, Merseyside, England. It commemorates the death of 27 lifeboatmen from Southport and St Annes who were lost in the attempt to rescue the crew of the German barque Mexico that had been driven into a sandbank in a gale in 1886. The memorial is in the form of a tomb chest on a tall plinth with carving and inscribed panels. It is recorded in the National Heritage List for England as a designated Grade II listed building.

== History ==
In a severe gale on 9 December 1886, the Mexico, a German barque, was driven on to the Horse Bank, a sandbank off Ainsdale, near Southport. Three lifeboats were launched to come to her rescue: Eliza Fernley from Southport, Laura Janet from St Annes, and Charles Biggs from Lytham. The crew from the Mexico were rescued by the Lytham lifeboat, but the other two lifeboats capsized. All thirteen of the crew of the St Annes lifeboat were lost, and only two of the sixteen members of the Southport lifeboat crew survived. It was the worst disaster in the history of the Royal National Lifeboat Institution.

Following the disaster, John Unwin, the mayor of Southport, set up a Disaster Fund, which raised £31,000. Most of this was used to help the dependants of the men lost, but in January 1887 the Fund allowed each of the three local committees a sum of £200 to erect monuments to commemorate the disaster. The Southport local committee established a competition to design a monument to stand in the cemetery at a cost of no more than £170. The design submitted by Ernest Walter Johnson was accepted, and £185 was allowed for its construction. The sculptor was Thomas Robinson.

== Description ==
The memorial is constructed in sandstone and polished granite, with plaques in marble. It is about 2.4 metres (7.9 ft) high and about 2.6 metres (8.5 ft) long. The memorial is in the form of a tomb chest on a tall plinth standing on an ashlar base. The base is decorated with rope-work, and on each corner is a bollard with an iron mooring ring. The plinth is in sandstone, and the tomb chest is in granite. There are pilasters on the corners, and each side contains a sunken marble plaque. Above is a cornice, and on the top of the memorial is a carving that represents a broken mast protruding at an angle through waves. Two of the panels contain inscriptions, and the panel on the west side has a relief carving. This carving depicts a view from above of a sinking lifeboat and its crew surrounded by waves. The inscriptions include the following:

IN GRATEFUL MEMORY OF
FOURTEEN OF THE HEROIC CREW OF THE SOUTHPORT LIFEBOAT
"ELIZA FEARNLEY"
WHO TOGETHER WITH THE CREW OF THE ST ANNE'S LIFEBOAT PERISHED ON
A GALLANT EFFORT TO RESCUE THE CREW OF THE GERMAN BARQUE "MEXICO"
WRECKED ON THIS COAST ON THE NIGHT OF THE 9TH DECEMBER 1886
GREATER LOVE HATH NO MAN THAT THIS THAT A MAN LAY DOWN HIS LIFE FOR HIS FRIENDS

== Appraisal ==
The memorial was designated as a Grade II listed building on 29 July 1999. Grade II is the lowest of the three grades of listing and is applied to "buildings of national importance and special interest".

== Related monuments ==
The Disaster Fund committee commissioned three other memorials to commemorate the event, another one in Southport, and memorials in Lytham and St Annes. The Southport memorial consists of an obelisk on the Promenade that also commemorates additional events. This is listed at Grade II, as are the memorials in Lytham and St Annes. The memorial in Lytham is in the churchyard of St Cuthbert's Church and has the form of a pinnacled tabernacle. The St Annes memorial stands on the Promenade, and consists of a statue of a lifeboatmen looking out to sea.

== See also ==
- Southport and St Anne's lifeboats disaster
- Listed buildings in Southport
- Southport Offshore Rescue Trust
