= Lifeboat Memorial, Lytham =

Memorial to 1886 lifeboat disaster

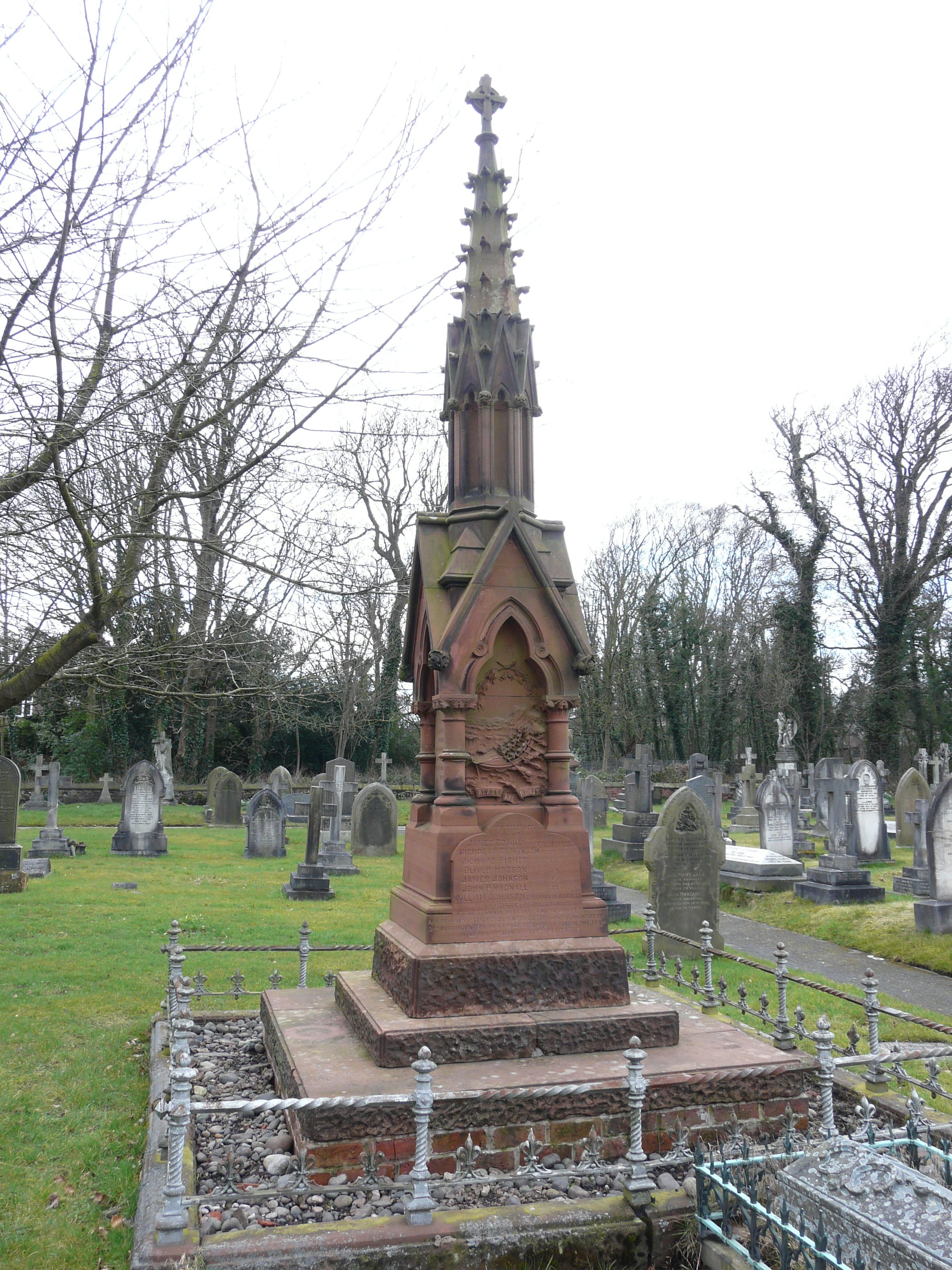
- Interactive map of Lifeboat Memorial, Lytham
- Location: Lytham, Lancashire, England
- Coordinates: 53°44′16″N 2°58′34″W
- Material: Red sandstone
- Completion date: Late 19th century

Listed Building – Grade II
- Official name: Laura Janet monument approximately 30 metres north of Church of St Cuthbert
- Designated: 15 February 1993
- Reference no.: 1297684

The Lifeboat Memorial, Lytham, is in the churchyard of St Cuthbert's Church, Lytham St Annes, Fylde, Lancashire, England. It commemorates the death of 27 lifeboatmen from Southport and St Annes who were lost in the attempt to rescue the crew of the German barque Mexico that had been driven into a sandbank in a gale in 1886. The memorial is in the form of a Gothic-style tabernacle with a crocketed pinnacle. It is recorded in the National Heritage List for England as a designated Grade II listed building.

== History ==
In a severe gale on 9 December 1886, the Mexico, a German barque, was driven on to the Horse Bank, a sandbank off Ainsdale, near Southport. Three lifeboats were launched to come to her rescue, Charles Biggs from Lytham, Eliza Fernley from Southport, and Laura Janet from St Annes. The crew from the Mexico were rescued by the Lytham lifeboat, but the other two lifeboats capsized. All thirteen of the crew of the St Annes lifeboat were lost, and only two of the sixteen members of the Southport lifeboat crew survived. It was the worst disaster in the history of the Royal National Lifeboat Institution.

Following the disaster, John Unwin, the mayor of Southport, set up a Disaster Fund, which raised £31,000. Most of this was used to help the dependants of the men lost, but in January 1887 the Fund allowed each of the three local committees a sum of £200 to erect monuments to commemorate the disaster. The Lytham committee erected their memorial in the churchyard of St Cuthbert's Church.

== Description ==
The memorial is constructed in red sandstone, and is in Gothic style in the form of a pinnacled tabernacle. It is about 4 metres (13.1 ft) high, and stands on a square base of two steps. On this is a stepped plinth carrying the tabernacle. The tabernacle has columns at the corners and cusped arches on each side, above which are steep gablets. On top of the tabernacle is an arcaded shaft, which is surmounted by a crocketed pinnacle. On the east side, the tabernacle has a carving depicting a crew rowing a lifeboat through a rough sea, and beneath this are inscribed the names of those who were lost in the disaster. There are also inscriptions on the other sides of the tabernacle.

== Appraisal ==
The memorial was designated as a Grade II listed building on 15 February 1993. Grade II is the lowest of the three grades of listing and is applied to "buildings of national importance and special interest".

== Related monuments ==
The Disaster Fund committee commissioned three other memorials to commemorate the event, two in Southport, and one in St Annes, all of which are listed at Grade II. In Southport, the Lifeboat Memorial is in the cemetery, and the Monumental Obelisk stands on the Promenade. The St Annes Memorial stands on the Promenade, and consists of a statue of a lifeboatmen looking out to sea.

== See also ==
- Southport and St Anne's lifeboats disaster
- Listed buildings in Lytham
