= Setta Axon =

German-born British social worker (1870–1910)

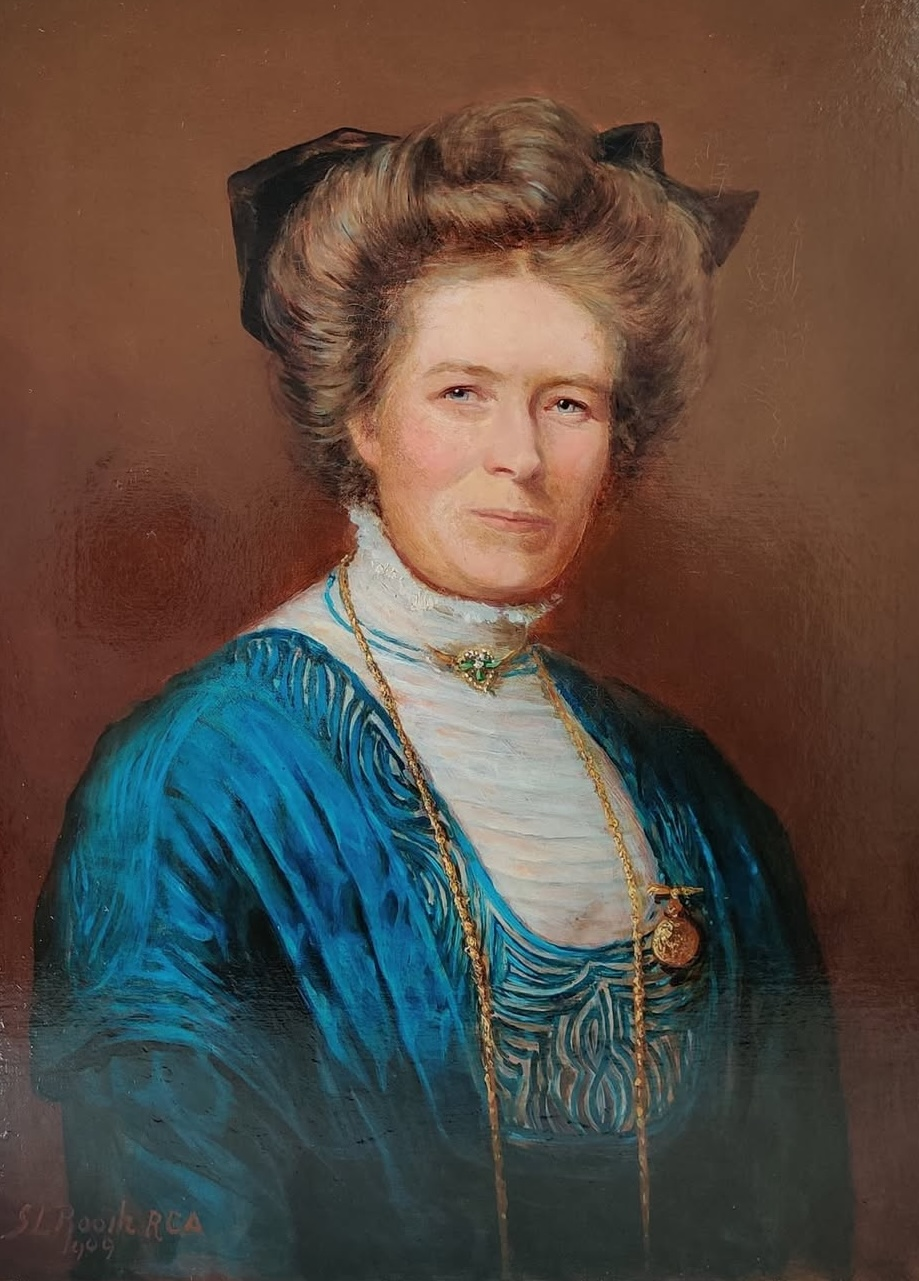
- 1909 portrait
- Born: Setta Lüft; 25 January 1870; Seligenstadt, Hesse, Germany
- Died: 17 March 1910 (aged 40); Southport, England
- Resting place: Southport Cemetery
- Occupations: Social worker; writer
- Known for: Social and charitable work in Manchester and Southport
- Spouse: William Edward Armytage Axon (m. 1892)
- Children: 1

Setta Axon (née Lüft; (Note: Her surname is also recorded as Luft and Lueft.) 25 January 1870 – 17 March 1910) was a German-born British social worker, writer, temperance advocate, and vegetarian. In Manchester, she worked with the Hulme Day Nursery, the Domestic Mission in Hulme, Roman Catholic poor-relief activities and the Moss Side Free Library, and supported Black visitors campaigning on racial issues. She later managed the Simple Life Home in Southport, participated in the Vegetarian Society, contributed papers to the Manchester Ladies' Literary Club and published an essay on the printer Hans Luft.

== Biography ==
=== Early and personal life ===
Axon was born Setta Lüft on 25 January 1870 at Seligenstadt, Hesse, Germany. Her father, Jakob Lüft, was a merchant. After losing her parents at an early age, she was raised by an aunt at Miltenberg, Bavaria, and educated at the Töchter Institut. She came to England to visit a friend and spent time in the house of Dr Haden Guest, a physician in Hulme, Manchester. On 19 November 1892 she married William Edward Armytage Axon at Chorlton register office. They had one daughter, Dorothy Setta.

=== Social and charitable work ===
Axon assisted Guest in his work to establish the Hulme Day Nursery. She also took part in social and charitable work connected with the Domestic Mission in Renshaw Street, Hulme, an undenominational organisation mainly run by Unitarians. Although she was a Roman Catholic, she led a girls' class there on Sunday afternoons and spent Mondays visiting members of the Penny Bank in their homes.

In Manchester, Axon attended the Church of the Holy Family, All Saints, and later the Church of the Holy Name. She served on the Ladies' Committee for the poor and aged and helped with the soup kitchen.

Axon supported the work of Black visitors to England who campaigned on racial issues. According to an obituary in The Vegetarian Messenger and Health Review, her home was open to such visitors. During a visit to the United States with her husband, she met Frederick Douglass, Paul Laurence Dunbar, and William Sanders Scarborough.

When her husband was involved in establishing the Moss Side Free Library, Axon prepared catalogue slips for books that were being stored at the couple's home before the library building was ready. Around 1906, the Axons moved to Southport, where she managed the Simple Life Home.

The Southport Visiter described Axon as known in England and America for temperance and social work. It also reported that she had contributed papers to the Manchester Ladies' Literary Club, and that her only printed essay appeared in The Antiquary and concerned the sixteenth-century printer Hans Luft, whose surname was shared by her family.

=== Vegetarianism ===
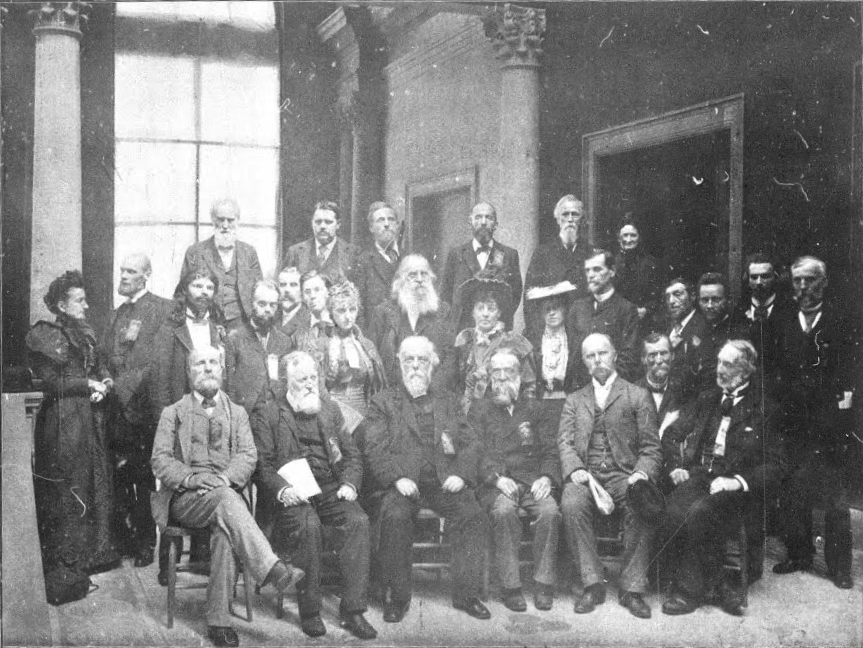
Axon (standing, middle row, centre-right, in the wide light-coloured hat) among the delegates to the World's International Vegetarian Congress at the 1893 Chicago World's Fair

Axon was vegetarian. She attended the World's International Vegetarian Congress at the 1893 Chicago World's Fair along with her husband. She joined the Vegetarian Society in 1898.

=== Death ===
Axon died on 17 March 1910 at Southport. Her funeral took place at Southport Cemetery after a preliminary service at a Roman Catholic church. Representatives attended from the Vegetarian Society, the Vegetarian Restaurants Company, and the Bible Christian Church. John Eyton Bickersteth Mayor, president of the Vegetarian Society, was also present and spoke at the graveside.

== Publications ==
- "Luther's 'Bible Printer'". The Antiquary. 37: 108–109. January–December 1901.
