= Listed buildings in Lytham =

Lytham is a conurbation in the Borough of Fylde, Lancashire, England that includes the town of Lytham and the districts of Ansdell and Fairhaven. It contains 91 buildings that are recorded in the National Heritage List for England as designated listed buildings. Of these, one is listed at Grade I, the highest of the three grades, four are at Grade II*, the middle grade, and the others are at Grade II, the lowest grade.

Until the 19th century Lytham was a village and part of the estate of Lytham Hall, the seat of the Clifton family. The earlier listed buildings consist mainly of the hall and the church, and associated structures, smaller houses and cottages, a farmhouse, and a windmill. From the late 1830s the town began to develop as a seaside resort and commuter town, and larger houses overlooking the Green toward the estuary of the River Ribble were built. The listed buildings from this time and later are varied and, in addition to larger houses, include hotels, public houses, shops, churches, a church hall, a market hall, public buildings such as institutes and libraries, memorials, and telephone kiosks.

== Key ==
| Grade | Criteria |
|---|---|
| I | Buildings of exceptional interest, sometimes considered to be internationally important |
| II* | Particularly important buildings of more than special interest |
| II | Buildings of national importance and special interest |

== Buildings ==
| Name and location | Photograph | Date | Notes | Grade |
|---|---|---|---|---|
| Screen wall, Lytham Hall; 53.74366°N 2.97718°W | — | 17th century (probable) | The wall was extended later, probably in the 18th century. It is built mainly in brick, is about 4 metres (13 ft) high on a plinth about 1 metre (3 ft 3 in) high, and extends for about 150 metres (490 ft) to the south of the hall. The wall incorporates an 18th-century two-storey cottage in the central portion, and a 19th-century lean-to privy towards the south end. The portion to the north of the cottage has half-height stepped buttresses, and to the south there are triangular buttress pilasters. | II |
| Stable block, Lytham Hall; 53.74444°N 2.97756°W | — | 17th century (probable) | The stable block was extended later. It is in brick, with some diapering and a slate roof, and consists of a four ranges around a rectangular courtyard. The north, east and south ranges have two storeys, and the west range is in a single storey. The openings include stable doors, other doorways, windows, and bull's eye pitching holes. | II |
| Church Farm; 53.74317°N 2.98927°W | — | Late 17th or early 18th century (probable) | The former farmhouse was remodelled in the 19th century with the addition of a rear wing, and extended by the addition of another bay to the right in the 20th century. It is built in rendered cobble, and has a slate roof. The house is in Jacobean style, with 1 1/2 storeys, and a four-bay front. On the front is a single-storey gabled porch. The windows are sliding sashes, those in the upper floor being in dormers. The cobbled garden wall is included in the listing. | II |
| Sundial; 53.73727°N 2.97644°W | | 18th century (probable) | The sundial is in the churchyard of St Cuthbert's Church. It is in sandstone, and consists of a vase pedestal with a gadrooned base, on which is a fluted collar and a circular moulded cap. On the top is a copper plate and a gnomon. | II |
| Lytham Hall; 53.74421°N 2.97649°W | | 1757–64 | A country house designed by John Carr in Palladian style. It is built in red brick with some stucco, and has stone dressings and a roof of Cumberland slate. The house has three storeys, with a symmetrical main front of nine bays. The central three bays project forward under a modillioned pediment, and contain a central round-headed doorway with a pedimented Doric doorcase. Flanking and dividing the bays in the upper two storeys are giant engaged Ionic columns. There are six bays on the left side, and five on the right, this side containing a pedimented Tuscan porch. At the rear is a Venetian window, the other windows being sashes. | I |
| 1 and 2 Regent Avenue; 53.75203°N 2.99090°W | — | 1767 | A pair of brick cottage with some cobbles, and roofs of asbestos sheeting and slate (formerly thatched). They have two low storeys (originally 1 1/2), and four bays with an extension to the left. Most of the windows are sliding sashes. | II |
| 14 Henry Street; 53.73616°N 2.96534°W | — | Late 18th century (probable) | A cottage in rendered cobble with a slate roof. It has 1 1/2 storeys with a projecting gabled porch that includes a hood mould and side windows. The other windows, two in each floor, are mullioned, those in the upper floor being in gabled dormers. | II |
| Dovecote, Lytham Hall; 53.74497°N 2.97822°W | | Late 18th century | The dovecote is in the grounds of the hall. It is built in red brick with a slate roof, and has a tall single storey and is in an octagonal plan. The dovecote contains a doorway and windows, and is surmounted by a louvred octagonal lantern with a lead roof and a ball finial. Inside are 850 nest boxes, and a finely balanced potence (rotating ladder). | II* |
| Statue of Diana; 53.74371°N 2.97618°W | — | Late 18th century (probable) | The statue of Diana is in the car park to the south of Lytham Hall. It is in white marble, and depicts Diana holding a deer by its horns in one hand, and reaching for an arrow with the other. The statue stands on a rectangular plinth and is surrounded by a circular wall. | II |
| Boundary wall, Lytham Hall; 53.74012°N 2.98453°W | | Late 18th to early 19th century (probable) | The wall is on the south and west boundaries of the estate, and it runs intermittently for 1.2 miles (1.9 km). The wall is built in cobblestones with rendered coping, and is about 2 metres (6 ft 7 in) high. At the north end is a former gateway with four gate piers. The piers are in sandstone with moulded cornices and shallow pyramidal caps, and contain cast iron gates. | II |
| Lytham Windmill; 53.73570°N 2.95550°W | | 1805 | The windmill is a tower mill and stands on Lytham Green. It was operational until 1918, and was restored in 1987. The windmill is in rendered brick on a plinth of cobble walling, and has a wooden cap and sails. It contains a doorway and windows, and at the top is a boat-shaped cap and fantail. | II |
| 1 Beach Street, 11 West Beach, Lytham; 53.73558°N 2.96709°W | — | c. 1820–30 (probable) | A pair of brick houses with sandstone dressings and a slate roof, in two storeys. There are four bays on West Beach, and three, under a pedimented gable, on Beach Street. On both fronts there is a round-headed doorway with a fanlight, and the windows are sashes. | II |
| 5 and 7 Dicconson Terrace; 53.73636°N 2.96288°W | — | 1825 | A pair of houses in a terrace, in red brick with sandstone dressings and slate roofs. Both houses have symmetrical three-bay fronts and are in two storeys, with No. 7 also having an attic. No. 7 has a doorcase with Tuscan semi-columns and a fanlight which is flanked by bow windows. Above there are sash windows, including one in the pedimented attic. No. 5 has a central porch, and this is flanked by two-storey canted bay windows. | II |
| Former stable, South Clifton Street; 53.73687°N 2.96020°W | — | Early 19th century | The former stable is built in cobble with some brick, and it has a slate roof. The building has a rectangular plan, and is in two storeys. It contains a central doorway with a round pitching hole above, with two windows to the right. | II |
| Vicarage; 53.73762°N 2.97755°W | — | c. 1830–40 | The vicarage is in brick on a stone plinth with sandstone dressings and a slate roof. It has two storeys, and there are three bays and two gables on each front. The central doorway has a triangular head. On the garden front is a canted bay window, and there are two ornamental chimney stacks with embattled caps. | II |
| 2–10 Bath Street; 53.73656°N 2.96039°W | — | 1834 | A row of four town houses with an annex at the south end. They are in red brick with sandstone dressings and hipped slate roofs, and have two storeys. Nos. 4–10 are symmetrical and each has a three bay front with a central round-headed doorway and a fanlight. No. 2 is set back at the right, and has a porch. The windows are sashes. | II |
| St Cuthbert's Church; 53.73738°N 2.97622°W | | 1834–35 | The church was built to replace an earlier church on the site, and was altered and expanded later. It is in Perpendicular style, and built in brick with sandstone dressings and a slate roof. The church consists of a nave with a clerestory, aisles, a vestry, a chancel, and a west tower. The tower is in three stages, with buttresses, a west doorway, clock faces, and a sundial on the south side. The tower has an embattled parapet, as do the nave, aisles, and chancel. | II* |
| Boundary walls, St Cuthbert's Church; 53.73709°N 2.97579°W | — | 1834–35 | The walls surround the churchyard and extend to the south of the Victory Hall to the east. The original walls are in cobble with chamfered stone coping. Later extensions are in brick with stone coping. | II |
| 2–4 Beach Street; 53.73579°N 2.96709°W | — | Early to mid-19th century | A row of three brick houses with sandstone dressings and slate roofs in Georgian style. They have two storeys, and each house has three bays. All houses have a central round-headed doorway with small pilasters, a cornice, and a semicircular fanlight, and to the right of the doorway is a two-storey canted bay window. The other windows are a mix of sashes and casements. | II |
| 4–18 Clifton Street; 53.73717°N 2.95833°W | | Early to mid-19th century | A terrace of eight pebbledashed cottages with sandstone dressings and slate roofs. They have two storeys and each cottage is in a single bay. On the front are three double gabled porches with doorways on the sides and two-light mullioned windows on the front. There are single porches on the sides; all the porches have apex finials. The windows are mullioned casements. | II |
| Church Lodge, Lytham Hall; 53.73738°N 2.97848°W | — | Early to mid-19th century | The lodge has pebble walls, red brick dressings, and a slate roof. It is in a cruciform plan, consisting of a main range with short side wings. The lodge is in a single storey, with attics in the wings. | II |
| Ivy Cottage; 53.73615°N 2.96568°W | — | Early to mid-19th century | A pebbledashed cottage with a slate roof in Georgian style. It has two low storeys and a symmetrical front. In the centre is a round-headed doorway with Tuscan quarter-columns, a moulded lintel, and a fanlight. There are two sash windows in each floor. The cast iron railings in front of the cottage are included in the listing. | II |
| Pinewood and Fountain House, 12 and 12A Central Beach; 53.73629°N 2.95903°W | — | 1838 | A pair of houses in simple Georgian style, they are in brown brick with sandstone dressings and a slate roof. They have two storeys, No. 12 has three bays, No. 12A has two, and both have extensions at the rear. Most of the windows are sashes. The entrances are on the sides, through round-headed doorways. Also on the side of No. 12 is a bay window and two triangular oriel windows. | II |
| Clifton Arms Hotel; 53.73579°N 2.96459°W | | 1839–40 | The hotel was later extended. It is in red brick with sandstone dressings and a hipped slate roof, and is in three storeys. It originally had a symmetrical five-bay front with a central entrance and full height canted bay windows in the outer bays. Later four bays were added to the right, including two more canted bays. The entrance is flanked by pairs of pilasters, and has an open pediment at the top containing a coat of arms in the tympanum. There are cast iron balconies in the upper two floors. | II |
| 13, 13A and 14 Central Beach; 53.73632°N 2.95844°W | — | c. 1840 | A pair of houses in brown brick with sandstone dressings and a slate roof. They have three storeys and each house has two bays. The doorways are paired in the centre, and each has Tuscan columns, a plain entablature, a moulded cornice, and a rectangular fanlight. The outer bays contains canted bay windows. The other windows contain altered glazing. | II |
| 13 and 15 Henry Street; 53.73637°N 2.96550°W | — | c. 1840 | A pair of brick cottages with sandstone dressings and a slate roof. They have two low storeys, and each cottage has two bays. The doorways are in the outer bays, and have stone surrounds and hood moulds. In each floor of the inner bay is a mullioned and transomed window. | II |
| Ivy House, 7 West Beach; 53.73571°N 2.96565°W | — | c. 1840 | A house in brown brick with sandstone dressings and a hipped slate roof, in Classical style. It has two storeys and a symmetrical three-bay front. There is a central Ionic porch, flanked by single-storey canted bay windows. The windows are sashes, except that in the centre of the first floor, which is a French window. | II |
| 16 and 16A West Beach; 53.73547°N 2.96823°W | — | c. 1840 | Originally one house, later divided into two, it is in brick with sandstone dressings and a slate roof. There are two storeys with cellars, and a four-bay front. In the outer bays are canted bay windows. The entrances are on the sides, that on the left side having a Georgian-style porch. The windows are sashes. | II |
| Convent of the Holy Cross and Passion; 53.73645°N 2.95730°W | — | c. 1840 | Originally a house, and later used as a nursing home, it is in red brick with sandstone dressings and a Cumbrian slate roof. The range facing the road has two storeys with cellars, and three bays. In the centre is a canted bay window with a parapet forming a balcony, which is flanked by French windows. The upper floor contains sash windows with shutters. Across the front is a verandah, and on the right side is a conservatory. | II |
| Boundary wall to Vicarage; 53.73714°N 2.97766°W | — | c. 1840 | The wall forms the southern boundary to the vicarage garden. It is in cobble with rounded stone coping, and is about 2 metres (6 ft 7 in) high. Near the east end are plain stone piers. | II |
| 16 and 18 Henry Street; 53.73614°N 2.96547°W | — | c. 1840–50 (probable) | A pair of cottages in roughcast cobble with sandstone dressings and a slate roof. They have two low storeys, and each cottage has two bays. In the right bay of No. 16 is a gabled porch with a finial, and there is a window in each floor of the left bay, the upper window in a gabled dormer. No. 18 has a plain doorway in the right bay, a window above, and a window in each floor of the left bay. All the windows are mullioned, and above the windows and doorways are hood moulds. | II |
| 17–25 Henry Street; 53.73637°N 2.96599°W | — | c. 1840–50 | A row of four (originally five) cottages in stuccoed cobble with sandstone dressings and a slate roof. On the front are three small and one larger gabled porches. The windows are mullioned. The garden walls, also mainly in cobble, are included in the listing. | II |
| Corby House; 53.73552°N 2.96762°W | — | c. 1840–50 | A pair of brick houses with sandstone dressings and a slate roof, in two storeys and with a symmetrical three-bay front. In the centre is a gabled porch, with a small oriel window above. The outer bays project slightly forwards and contain two-storey canted bay windows. The other entrance is on the left side through a gabled porch. | II |
| Main Lodges and Entrance Gates, Lytham Hall; 53.74128°N 2.96341°W | | 1840s | The building is constructed in red brick with sandstone dressings and a slate roof, and is in Italianate style. It is symmetrical, and consists of a pair of single-storey, single-cell lodges flanking a two-storey round-headed archway. Along the tops of the lodges is a balustraded parapet, and above the arch is a modillioned cornice and a carved coat of arms. Within the arch are full-height wrought iron gates. Attached to each lodge is a short screen wall and, running from the east lodge for about 550 metres (1,800 ft), is a boundary wall built in cobbles. | II |
| 14A Central Beach; 53.73633°N 2.95830°W | — | c. 1845–55 | A small house in brown brick with sandstone dressings and a slate roof. It has two storeys and two bays, and an extension to the rear. In the right bay is a doorway with fluted pilasters and a fanlight, and above it is a narrow sash window. The left bay contains a two-storey canted bay window with altered glazing. | II |
| 15, 15A, 16 and 16A Central Beach; 53.73636°N 2.95805°W | — | c. 1845–60 | A pair of houses, later subdivided, in red brick with sandstone dressings and a slate roof, in Jacobethan style. They have an H-shaped plan with projecting outer wings and rear extensions. The houses have two storeys with attics, and a symmetrical five-bay front. The outer and central bays are gabled with finials, and the central bay contains a pair of gabled porches, above which is an oriel window. The outer bays contain two-storey canted bay windows, and the adjacent bays have rectangular windows with hood moulds. | II |
| Garden wall, 15–16 Central Beach; 53.73625°N 2.95797°W | — | c. 1845–60 | The wall is on a brick plinth and consists of long rectangular brick panels filled with cobbles and with sandstone coping. It is about 1 metre (3 ft 3 in) high. | II |
| The Leas, 17–18 Central Beach; 53.73639°N 2.95768°W | — | c. 1845–60 | A pair of houses, later divided into flats, in red brick with sandstone dressings and a slate roof. They have two storeys, and each house has a two-bay front, with larger gables over the outer bays and smaller gables over the inner ones. The doorways are paired in the centre and are linked by a loggia. In the outer bays of both houses are two-storey bay windows, that of No. 17 being canted, and that of No. 18 being triangular. The gables have decorative bargeboards with obelisk finials. | II |
| Garden wall, 17–18 Central Beach; 53.73629°N 2.95765°W | — | c. 1845–60 | The wall is on a brick plinth and consists of long rectangular brick panels filled with cobbles and with sandstone coping. It is about 1 metre (3 ft 3 in) high. | II |
| Former Methodist Chapel; 53.73645°N 2.96068°W | | 1846 | Since closure as a Methodist chapel, it has been used for other purposes. The building is in red brick with sandstone dressings and a slate roof. There are two storeys and a symmetrical front of three bays divided by giant pilasters. The central doorway has a moulded architrave, a modillioned cornice, and a fanlight, and it is flanked by tall sash windows. At the top of the entrance front is an upstand containing the date. There are more sash windows along the sides of the chapel. | II |
| Hastings Place; 53.73777°N 2.96476°W | — | c. 1846–53 | A terrace of houses on a curving site, in red brick with sandstone dressings and slate roofs. The central house is the largest, with 2 1/2 storeys and a three-bay front with two gables. The other houses have two storeys, and each has two windows in the upper floor, and one window and a round-headed doorway in the ground floor. Four other houses have gables, and some have flat-roofed porches, while the others have flush doorways with canopies. | II |
| The Coppice, 11 Central Beach; 53.73623°N 2.95936°W | — | 1847 | A house, later converted into flats, in red brick with sandstone dressings and a slate roof. It is in 2 1/2 storeys, with one gabled bay facing the road, which contains a two-storey canted bay window surmounted by a balcony. On the right side is a projecting wing, with a porch in the angle, and 20th-century oriel windows on three levels. | II |
| Market Hall; 53.73730°N 2.96490°W | | 1847–48 | The market hall was designed by Charles Reed, the clock tower was added in about 1870, and the building has since been adapted for other purposes. It is in red brick with sandstone dressings and a hipped slate roof. The main part is rectangular, in a single storey, and with a front of nine arcaded bays. There is a two-storey annex added to the west side, and in the centre of the east front is a clock tower. The tower is in Italianate style, and has three stages, with an archway in the bottom stage, a three-light window in the middle stage, and clock faces on the upper stage. On the top is an octagonal bellcote with an ogival cap. | II |
| 29 and 30 East Beach; 53.73681°N 2.95316°W | — | 1848–49 | A pair of brick houses with sandstone dressings and a slate roof. They have two storeys and attics, and each house has a two-bay front. The doorways are in the inner bays and have pilastered architraves with cornices and fanlights. Above the doorways are round-headed windows. The outer bays contain two-storey canted bay windows. No. 30 also has a gabled half-dormer. | II |
| St John's Church; 53.73692°N 2.95481°W | | 1848–49 | Designed by E. H. Shellard in Early English style, the chancel was extended and transepts were added in 1856–57. The church is built in sandstone with a Cumberland slate roof, and consists of a nave with a clerestory, aisles, transepts, a chancel with a south chapel and a north vestry, and a southwest steeple. The steeple has a four-stage tower, and a broach spire with two tiers of lucarnes. The windows are lancets. | II* |
| 10 Central Beach; 53.73622°N 2.95948°W | — | Mid-19th century | A house later converted into flats, in red brick with sandstone dressings and a slate roof, and in Tudor style, It has 2 !/2 storeys and a symmetrical three-bay front. The narrow central bay contains a Tudor arched doorway with a hood mould, above which is an oriel window, and a half-dormer containing a casement. The outer bays contain casement windows in each floor. | II |
| 25 and 26 East Beach; 53.73678°N 2.95369°W | — | Mid-19th century | A pair of houses in Neo-Jacobean style, in red brick with sandstone dressings and a green slate roof. They are in two storeys with attics, and each has a two-bay front, with porches on the sides, and rear extensions. The outer bays have shaped gables with finials, and contain two-storey canted bay windows with panels between the storeys and panelled parapets. The inner bays have windows in both floors with quoined surrounds. | II |
| 3 Queen Street; 53.73637°N 2.96530°W | — | Mid-19th century | A brick house on a corner site, with sandstone dressings and a slate roof. It is in two storeys and has a three-bay front. There is a central doorway with a stone surround and a hood mould, and to the right is a canted bay window. On the left side is another canted bay window. The windows are mullioned and transomed. | II |
| 4 Queen Street; 53.73645°N 2.96531°W | — | Mid-19th century | A small brick house with sandstone dressings and a slate roof. It has two storeys and two bays, and there is a central doorway with a stone surround. To the right is a canted bay window. To the left, and in the upper floor, are mullioned and transomed windows. | II |
| 5 and 6 Queen Street; 53.73652°N 2.96530°W | — | Mid-19th century | A pair of town houses in brick with sandstone dressings and a slate roof. They have two storeys and each house has two bays. In the right bay is a doorway with a pilastered architrave and a fanlight, and in the left bay is a single-storey canted bay window. All the windows are sashes. | II |
| 2 Station Road; 53.73806°N 2.95677°W | | Mid-19th century | Originally a hotel, later a public house known as The Hansom Cab, it is stuccoed with sandstone dressings and a hipped slate roof. There are two storeys with cellars, and a front of five bays, the lateral three bays being symmetrical with a central porch. The porch has two fluted Doric columns and an entablature. The windows in the ground floor are sashes, and in the upper floor they contain altered glazing. | II |
| 51–61 Westby Street; 53.73821°N 2.96004°W | — | Mid-19th century | A terrace of six cottages in brick, partly roughcast and partly stuccoed, with sandstone dressings and a slate roof, in two storeys. In the centre of the symmetrical front is a gabled porch, and lateral to this are two gablets. All the windows and doors have hood moulds. Some mullioned and transomed windows remain, but most windows have altered glazing. | II |
| Gate piers and walls, Church Lodge; 53.73727°N 2.97832°W | — | Mid-19th century (probable) | The gate piers flank the entrance to the former drive to Lytham Hall. They are about 3 metres (9.8 ft) high, in red brick with cobble panels, each on a stone plinth and with a moulded cap. Radiating from the piers are convex walls about 1 metre (3 ft 3 in) high, with panels of similar materials, terminating in piers similar to those flanking the drive. | II |
| Railings and gateway, Lytham Hall; 53.74387°N 2.97251°W | — | Mid-19th century (probable) | The railings are in cast iron and form an inner boundary to the park. There are ornamental standards by the drive, with a short section to the south, and a longer section to the north. | II |
| Queen's Hotel; 53.73614°N 2.96061°W | | Mid-19th century | The hotel is in brick with sandstone dressings, all painted, and has a slate roof. It has three storeys, and an L-shaped plan, with a symmetrical five-bay main front, and a wing at the rear. In the centre is a wide single-storey porch with a round-headed opening. The outer bays contain two-storey canted bay windows. Some of the windows are sashes, and others have altered glazing. | II |
| 1 and 3 Bath Street; 53.73662°N 2.96069°W | — | c. 1850–60 | A pair of brick houses with sandstone dressings, and roofs of composition tile and slate. They have two storeys and each house is in two bays. The doorways are paired in the centre and above them is a continuous verandah canopy with a fretted fringe. Flanking the doorways are rectangular bay windows with swept roofs and similar canopies. In the upper floor are segmental-headed windows. | II |
| 9 Bath Street; 53.73669°N 2.96072°W | — | c. 1850–60 | A small brick house on a corner site with sandstone dressings and a slate roof. It has two storeys, with the single bay on Bath Street having a full-height canted bay window containing sashes. The other front is gabled and contains a round-headed doorway with a fanlight and a trellised porch, and has a sash window above. | II |
| 14–22 Station Road; 53.73721°N 2.95663°W | — | c. 1850–60 | A row of five small houses, in red brick with slate roofs. They have two storeys, and form a symmetrical block, each house having two bays. All the houses have a single-storey canted bay window, and a doorway with a wooden panelled pilastered architrave and a dentilled cornice. At the rear are tall cobblestone walls, which are included in the listing. | II |
| 47–51 Warton Street; 53.73775°N 2.95415°W | — | c. 1850–60 | A row of three houses in brick with sandstone dressings and slate roofs, in two storeys. Nos. 47 and 49 have doorways with pilastered architraves, moulded cornices, and fanlights. The entrance to No. 51 is through a porch on the right side, and this house has a canted bay window, the other windows in the row being sashes. | II |
| 1 and 2 West Beach; 53.73590°N 2.96335°W | — | c. 1850–60 | A pair of stuccoed cottages with a slate roof. They have two storeys, and each cottage has two bays, with entrances on the sides, and extensions at the rear. In the ground floor of both houses are two French windows, and No. 2 has a latticed verandah. The windows in the upper floor have altered glazing. | II |
| 15 West Beach; 53.73551°N 2.96789°W | — | c. 1850–60 | A brick house with sandstone dressings and a slate roof. It has two storeys and a front of three bays, the right bay projecting forward as a gabled wing. The two bays on the left each contain a tall window in both floors, and there is a ground floor verandah. In the right wing is a single-storey canted bay window, above which is a window with two round-headed lights. On the left side is a doorway with a moulded architrave. | II |
| Former Estate Office; 53.73771°N 2.96546°W | | c. 1860 | The office is in red brick with sandstone dressings and a hipped slate roof, and is in Italianate style. There are two storeys, five symmetrical bays on the front, and three on the sides. The central bay projects forward and has an open pediment. In the ground floor is a segmental-headed doorway with a large architrave including a keystone, an inscribed frieze, and a pierced parapet. In the upper floor is a Venetian window, above which is a stone plaque with a coat of arms. The windows all have keystones and are sashes. The attached screen walls are included in the listing. | II |
| Seafield; 53.73546°N 2.97574°W | — | c. 1860 | A large house later divided into flats, it is in brick with sandstone dressings and a hipped slate roof. The house has two storeys with basements, and a symmetrical front of seven bays. On each side is a single-storey, set-back, single-bay extension. Steps lead up to a central doorway with an architrave, keystone, frieze and modillioned cornice. All the windows have segmental heads and architraves, those in the ground floor with altered glazing, and those in the upper floor with sashes. | II |
| Lytham United Reformed Church; 53.73799°N 2.95933°W | | 1861–62 | Originally a Congregational church designed by W. F. Poulton, it was extended to the north in 1910. The church is in yellow sandstone with red sandstone dressings and a slate roof. The entrance front is to the south, and contains a gabled porch and a five-light window. On the right of the front is a slender tower containing doorways. The tower rises to form an octagonal spire containing tall gabled bell openings. The extension at the north end contains vestries and a meeting room. The windows along the sides of the church are lancets, and those in the extension have Perpendicular tracery. Outside the church is a boundary wall with Gothic gate piers, which are included in the listing. | II |
| Sunday school 53.73784°N 2.95949°W | — | 1861–62 | Designed by W. F. Poulton as a Sunday school for the Congregational church, it is partly in yellow sandstone with red sandstone dressings, and partly in brick, with a slate roof. The building is in Early English style, with a rectangular plan, and it has a gabled porch to the southeast, and a parallel annex on the west side. Most of the windows are lancets. | II |
| Old lifeboat house 53.73551°N 2.95544°W | | 1863 | The former lifeboat house is in cobble on a sandstone plinth with dressings in red brick and a slate roof. It is in a single storey with sides of three bays. On the sides are louvred windows, benches sheltered under the overhanging roof that is carried on cast iron columns, and gabled dormers with finials. On the roof is a wooden lantern with a pyramidal roof and a weathervane. Facing the former slipway are large double doors under a gable with a finial. | II |
| 8 and 9 Central Beach; 53.73623°N 2.95974°W | — | Mid to late 19th century | A pair of red brick houses with sandstone dressings and a slate roof. They have an H-shaped plan with projecting wings and extensions to the rear. The houses have two storeys and attics, and a symmetrical front of six bays. The outer bays are gabled and contain two-storey canted bay windows. There is a gabled porch in the angles of the wings containing an arched doorway. The inner bays contain windows with hood moulds. | II |
| 8 and 9 Market Square; 53.73699°N 2.96427°W | — | Mid to late 19th century | A pair of shops with plate glass windows in cast iron and wooden frames. They are in painted brick with rusticated quoins and a slate roof, and have two storeys. No. 8 has a central entrance flanked by bay windows with curved corners and slender Ionic colonettes. No. 9 also has a central entrance with wide plate glass windows and, in the upper floor a full height three-light plate glass window. | II |
| Garden wall, Fairlawn; 53.73516°N 2.98058°W | | Mid to late 19th century | The wall stretches for about 330 metres (1,080 ft) round the boundaries of the gardens of Fairlawn and other private houses. It is built in cobblestone with brick facing and sandstone copings. The wall is about 2 metres (6 ft 7 in) high, and contains gateways in various styles. | II |
| Summer house, Fairlawn; 53.73531°N 2.97972°W | | Mid to late 19th century | A summer house, or gazebo, in the grounds of a large house, it is in brick with sandstone dressings, and has a slate roof. The building has an octagonal plan, and stands on a square plinth. It is in a single storey, and has a Tudor arched doorway, sash windows, and a tall pyramidal roof with a weathervane. | II |
| Wall and lychgate, St John's Church; 53.73651°N 2.95503°W | — | Mid to late 19th century | The wall on the southern boundary of the churchyard is about 1 metre (3 ft 3 in) high and consists of panels formed by sandstone. about 2 metres (6 ft 7 in) long, containing pebbles. The lychgate is dated 1897, and has open timber-work with Tudor arched openings. It contains wooden gates, and has an overhanging slate roof with terracotta ridge tiles and wooden finials. | II |
| Tambourine Cottages; 53.74345°N 2.99179°W | — | Mid to late 19th century | A terrace of eight cottages with cobble walls, red brick quoins, some sandstone dressings, and slate roofs. They have two storeys, and form a symmetrical block with each cottage having a two-bay front. In the centre is a two-storey gabled porch. Almost all the windows are mullioned two-light casements. At the front is a wall of coursed cobbles about 1 metre (3 ft 3 in) high, containing pairs of simple gate piers. | II |
| Lytham Methodist Church; 53.73798°N 2.96350°W | | 1868 | The Methodist church is built in brick with a sandstone façade, in Classical style. It has a symmetrical entrance front in two storeys and five bays. In the centre is a recessed porch with two giant Corinthian columns, and the outer bays are flanked by Corinthian pilasters. At the top is a moulded entablature that includes a dentilled and modillioned cornice, and a balustraded parapet with Baroque upstands and urns. Above the doorway is an inscribed plaque. | II |
| Public library, institute and lecture room 53.73751°N 2.95887°W | | 1878 | Built as an institute with a billiard room and lecture room, and later also used as a public library, it is in red brick with dressings in sandstone and polychrome brick and with slate roofs. It is in Gothic style, and has a U-shaped plan. The main block has two storeys and a three-bay front, the outer bays being gabled with finials. In the central bay is a gabled porch, and at the top is a stepped parapet. The outer bays contains bay windows. Behind the main block is a single-storey block with five bays and two gables. | II |
| Clifton Memorial Fountain; 53.73872°N 2.96351°W | | c. 1882 | The drinking fountain is in sandstone and consists of four oval bowls on a pedestal and surmounted by a carved superstructure. This is contained in a square shelter with sandstone pedestals and timber posts carrying a pyramidal tiled roof. On the west side is a horse trough. | II |
| Laura Janet monument 53.73774°N 2.97621°W | | 1887 | The monument is to the memory of the crew of the St Annes lifeboat Laura Janet who were lost in an attempted rescue in 1886. It is in Gothic style, constructed in sandstone, and consists of a pinnacled tabernacle about 4 metres (13 ft) high, on a stepped plinth. On the east side is a carving depicting a crew rowing a lifeboat through a rough sea, and beneath this are inscribed the names of those who were lost. | II |
| 4 Dicconson Terrace; 53.73631°N 2.96338°W | — | 1899 (probable) | Originally a bank manager's house, it is in red brick with red sandstone dressings and a slate roof. There are two storeys and a symmetrical three-bay front. The central doorway has a three-light fanlight, and it is flanked by two mullioned and transomed bay windows. Above the doorway is a two-light window under a shaped gable. The outer bays contain half-dormers with hipped roofs and apex finials. | II |
| Heritage Centre; 53.73643°N 2.96345°W | | 1899 | Originally designed for the Manchester and County Bank by Mills and Murgatroyd in Tudor style, it was later used for other purposes. The building stands on a corner site, and is in red brick with red sandstone dressings and a slate roof. It has a rectangular plan with a canted corner, it is mainly in a single storey, and has fronts of three and five bays. On the corner is a Tudor arched doorway with an elaborately carved surround, above which is a panelled parapet and a shaped gable containing a plaque with the date. | II |
| Promenade shelter 53.73466°N 2.97066°W | | c. 1900 (probable) | The shelter is in cast iron with a wooden felted roof. It contains a longitudinal partition and benches. The roof is carried on six decorative columns. The ends and the partition contain panels in the lower part and arcades in the upper part, all decorated with various motifs. | II |
| Police station and magistrates' court 53.73788°N 2.95878°W | | 1900–02 | Designed by Henry Littler, the building is in red brick with dressings in sandstone and timber, and it has a hipped slate roof. The building is in Edwardian Baroque style, with the police station at the front; this has two-storeys and four unequal bays. In the second bay is an entrance turret that starts square, rises to octagonal, and has an ogival cap with a finial. In the upper floor of the wider third bay is a large Venetian window with a balcony. At the rear are two magistrates' courts. No. 2 court has been refurbished, but No. 1 court has retained many original fittings. | II |
| Methodist lecture hall 53.73817°N 2.96350°W | — | 1901 | The lecture hall is attached to Lytham Methodist Church. It is built in yellow brick with red sandstone dressings and has a slate roof. The building is in Edwardian Baroque style and is in a single storey with a linear plan, and with an entrance porch to the left, above which is a lead dome. The main range has a symmetrical front of five bays, and there is a Venetian window on the north front. | II |
| Gate piers and walls, Fairhaven United Reformed Church; 53.73862°N 2.99021°W | — | c. 1904 | The walls form the boundary of the churchyard and consist of low red brick walls with terracotta copings. These incorporate low brick piers at intervals. At the entrance to the churchyard are four larger square piers in Baroque style with dentilled cornices and domed caps. | II |
| Fairhaven United Reformed Church; 53.73851°N 2.99074°W | | 1907–12 | Originally a Congregational church, it was designed by Briggs, Wolstenholme and Thornely, in a free Byzantine style. It is built mainly in white faience, with a hall at the rear in red brick with yellow terracotta dressings; it is roofed in slate and bituminous asphalt. The main part of the church is square with a domed roof. At the northeast corner is an octagonal minaret tower, and at two other corners are smaller octagonal turrets with domed lanterns. The hall contains a Diocletian window. | II* |
| Ansdell Baptist Church; 53.74205°N 2.98721°W | | 1908 | The Baptist church was designed by Haywood and Harrison in Perpendicular style with Arts and Crafts features. It is built in Accrington brick with sandstone dressings and a Cumbrian slate roof. The church consists of a nave with a narthex, transepts, an apse, and a northwest tower. The tower is in three stages, with buttresses rising above the height of the parapet, and it contains a doorway. The parapet is arcaded with triangular shafts in the centre of each side, and on top of the tower is a narrow spire. | II |
| Ansdell Institute and Public Hall; 53.74268°N 2.99220°W | | 1909 | The institute and adjoining public were designed by G. H. Willoughby, and are built in Accrington brick with orange terracotta dressings and red tiled roofs. The institute has two storeys and three bays in Jacobean style. The central doorway has an entablature with urns. At the top is a Dutch gable containing a datestone, and a parapet with urns. To the right is the public hall, in Baroque style. This has two and three storeys, and a single-storey three-bay front containing a central entrance and flanking windows, all round-headed. | II |
| St Joseph's Church; 53.74488°N 2.98953°W | | 1909–14 | A Roman Catholic church by Pugin and Pugin in Decorated style, it is built in yellow sandstone with red sandstone dressings and has roofs of Cumbrian slate. It consists of a nave, aisles, double transepts incorporating chapels, a sacristy, a sanctuary, and a detached northeast tower, The tower has three stages, and includes angle buttresses rising to become octagonal pinnacles, a north doorway, a canopied niche containing a statue, and a machiolated parapet with pierced lettering and crow-stepped coping. | II |
| Victory Hall; 53.73736°N 2.97523°W | | 1920 | The hall is the parish hall of St Cuthbert's Church, and was built to commemorate those who served in the First World War. It is in red brick with sandstone dressings and a slate roof, with a rectangular plan, and is Perpendicular in style. The hall has a main part of six bays, with lower two-bay service wings on each side. The bays are separated by buttresses rising above the eaves, the second and fifth bays being larger and gabled. There is a porch in both service wings. | II |
| War memorial, Market Square; 53.73724°N 2.96448°W | | c. 1920–25 | The memorial is to those fallen in the First World War. It is in white Portland stone, and consists of a tall, slightly tapering cenotaph with a decorative top. The names are inscribed in columns. | II |
| War memorial, Victory Hall; 53.73720°N 2.97525°W | — | 1922 | The war memorial is in sandstone. It has a two-stepped base, and a square plinth on which is a tapering shaft surmounted by a cross. There are inscriptions on the sides of the plinth, including the names of those lost in the First World War. | II |
| Waysiders; 53.74561°N 2.99855°W | — | 1934 | The house was designed by Lumb and Walton in Art Deco style, and it was extended in the 1960s. It is built in brick, partly rendered, and has a roof of Belgian green glazed tiles. The house has two storeys and a front of three bays, the central bay projecting forward and containing a porch. All the windows have metal frames. At the rear is a single-storey extension and a timber-framed bow window, and there is a similar bow window on the west side. | II |
| Telephone kiosks 53.73691°N 2.96279°W | — | 1935 | Three K6 type telephone kiosks, designed by Giles Gilbert Scott, arranged as a pair and a single kiosk. Constructed in cast iron with a square plan and a dome, they have three unperforated crowns in the top panels. | II |
