= William Richard Lavender =

English painter (1877–1915)

William Richard Lavender (1877 – 13 August 1915) was an English painter.

== Biography ==
Lavender was born in the final quarter of 1877 in Ormskirk, Lancashire.

His major works were Young Girl Collecting Fruit (1900), Jeremiah Horrocks (1681–1641) (1903), and In Disgrace (1905).

William Lavender died on 13 August 1915, aged 37.

== See also ==
- Astley Hall Museum and Art Gallery Chorley
- Williamson Art Gallery & Museum
