= Duke Street Cemetery =

Cemetery in Southport, England

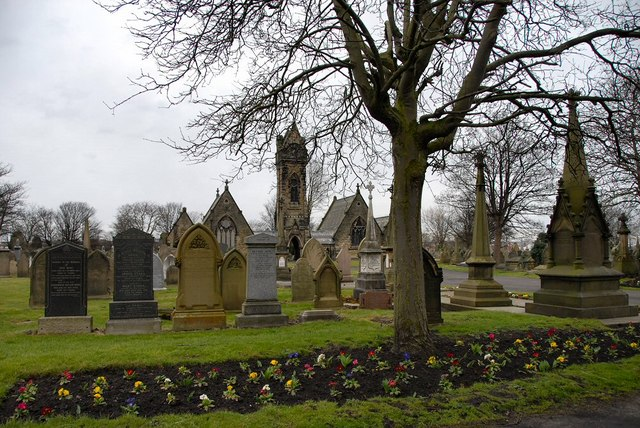
- Duke Street Cemetery in 2008
- Interactive map of Duke Street Cemetery

Details
- Established: 1866; 160 years ago
- Location: Cemetery Road, Southport, Merseyside
- Country: England
- Coordinates: 53.63434°N 2.99930°W
- Type: Public
- Owned by: Sefton Council
- Find a Grave: Duke Street Cemetery

Duke Street Cemetery, historically known as Southport Cemetery, is a public cemetery in Southport, Merseyside, England. It opened in 1866 and is the oldest cemetery administered by Sefton Council. The older section was laid out by landscape architect Edward Kemp. The cemetery includes Victorian memorials, three Grade II listed structures, and Commonwealth war graves from the First and Second World Wars.

== History and layout ==
The cemetery was established for the Southport Improvement Commissioners and opened in 1866. Edward Kemp designed the older section, which has large Victorian funerary monuments. Vehicle access to this part of the cemetery is restricted.

The newer section has lawn-style memorials. A memorial garden for babies opened there in the mid-1990s.

== Buildings and monuments ==
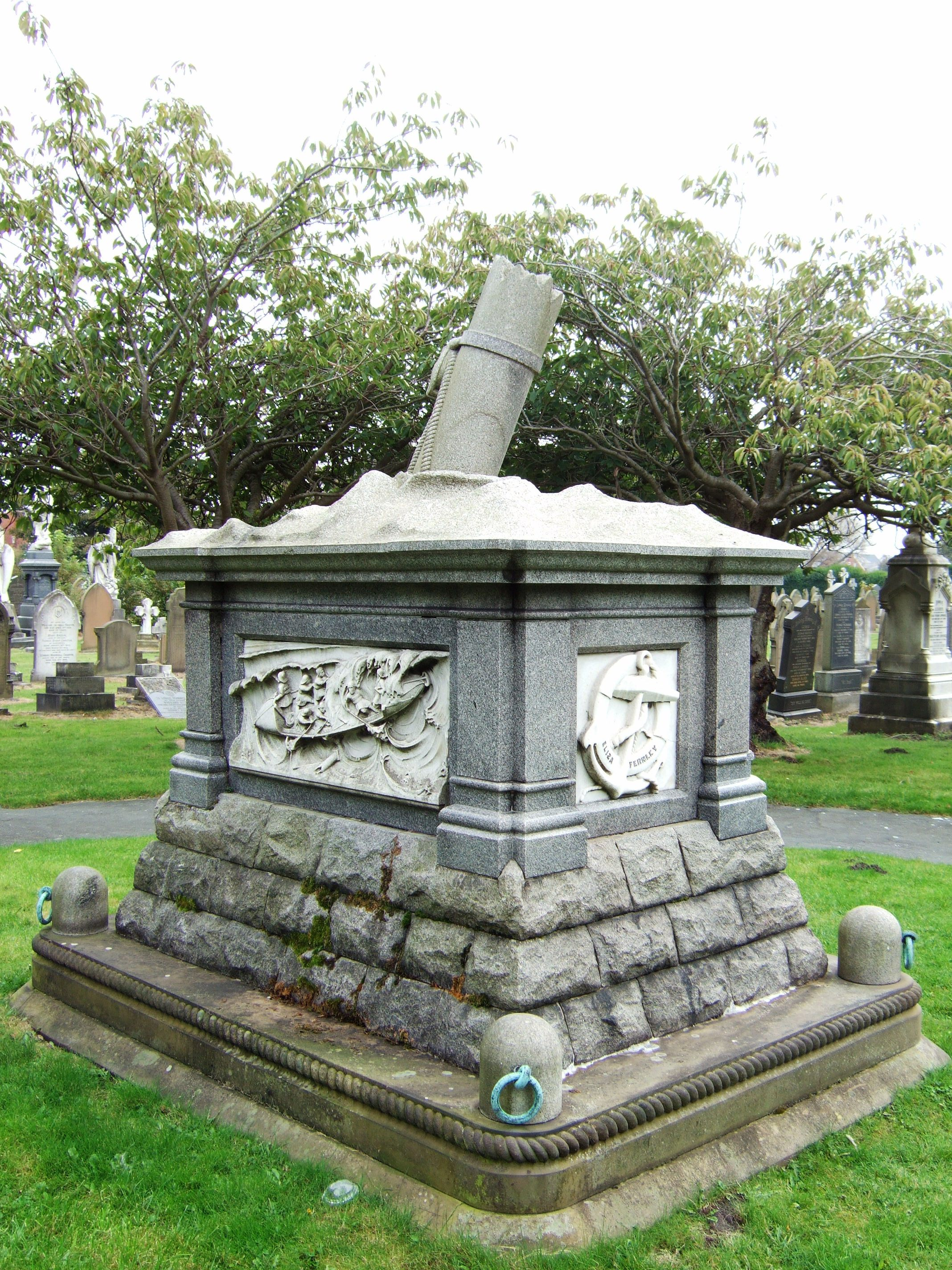
Lifeboat Memorial

Near the entrance is a pair of cemetery chapels joined by cloisters and a central clock tower. Built c. 1865 for the Southport Improvement Commissioners, the sandstone complex was designed in the High Victorian Gothic style. One chapel was later used for storage. The complex was listed at Grade II in 1999.

A separate Roman Catholic cemetery chapel stands to the north. Probably built in 1865, it is a sandstone building in the Early English Gothic style, with an apse, porch, and vestry. The disused chapel was listed at Grade II in 1999.

The cemetery has a memorial to the 14 crew members of the Southport lifeboat Eliza Fernley, who died on 9 December 1886 while attempting to rescue the crew of the German barque Mexico. Erected c. 1888 – c. 1890, it was designed by architect Ernest Walter Johnson and sculpted by Thomas Robinson. The monument consists of a sandstone and granite tomb chest with marble plaques and relief carvings, including a depiction of the lifeboat beneath a wave. It was listed at Grade II in 1999.

== War graves ==
There are 97 Commonwealth service burials from the First World War and 69 from the Second World War in the cemetery. Most are dispersed throughout the grounds, with small plots containing burials from both wars. Service personnel buried in collective and joint graves in Plot C are commemorated on a screen wall.

The cemetery also has memorials to those who died in the two world wars.

== Management ==
In October 2016, local radio presenter Trevor Ford criticised the condition of the cemetery after overgrown grass prevented him from locating his grandfather's grave. Sefton Council said that some older areas had previously been converted into meadow sections and that its contractor would tend the site within the following weeks.

In November 2024, local councillor John Pugh called on Sefton Council to reconsider allowing parts of the cemetery to grow as wildflower meadows. He said that overgrowth had made some graves inaccessible and that the scheme had failed. Councillor Peter Harvey, the council cabinet member responsible for cemeteries, said the policy was intended to support biodiversity while preserving the cemetery's function as a place of remembrance. He said the affected areas would be cut back during the winter maintenance programme.

== Notable burials ==
- Setta Axon (1870–1910), German-born British social worker
- William Richard Lavender (1877–1915), English painter
