= St Cuthbert's Church, Lytham =

Coordinates: 53.7374°N 2.9762°W

St Cuthbert's
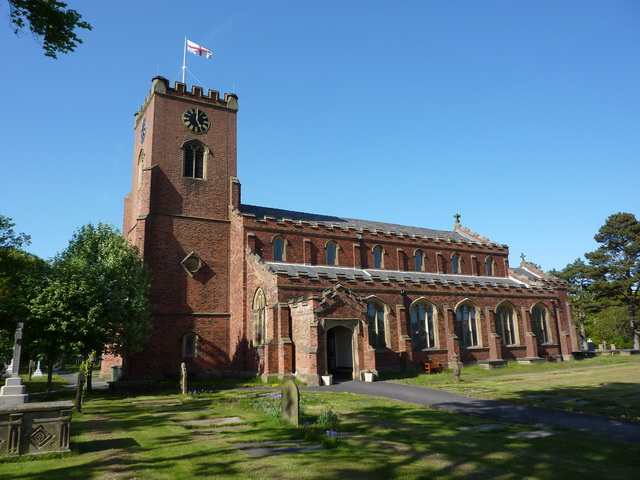

- Location in Lytham St Annes
- OS grid reference: SD 357 272
- Location: Lytham, Lancashire
- Denomination: Anglican
- Website: St Cuthbert, Lytham

History
- Status: Parish church

Architecture
- Functional status: Active
- Heritage designation: Grade II*
- Architect(s): W. H. Hobden; Paley and Austin; Austin and Paley
- Completed: 1834–1835

Administration
- Province: York
- Diocese: Blackburn
- Archdeaconry: Lancaster
- Deanery: Kirkham

St Cuthbert's is an Anglican church in Lytham, Lancashire, England. It was built 1834–1835, replacing a previous church on the same site. It is an active parish church in the Diocese of Blackburn. Since 1971 it has been designated a Grade II* listed building.

== History ==
The current church is the third to be built on the site. A church was built in 1770, replacing an older structure of cobbles. The 1770 building was in turn replaced by the current structure, built in 1834–1835 to a design by W. H. Hobden. It was enlarged in 1872 with the addition of a chancel by the Lancaster architects Paley and Austin. In 1882 the same partnership added the north aisle, a vestry and the organ chamber, followed by new seating and a new front to the gallery in 1887. The church was further enlarged in 1909. A memorial chapel was added in 1931 by the successors in the practice, Austin and Paley. On 13 January 1971 the church was designated a Grade II* listed building. The Grade II* designation is the second highest of the three grades.

St Cuthbert's is an active parish church in the Diocese of Blackburn, the Archdeaconry of Lancaster, and the Deanery of Kirkham.

== Architecture ==
=== Exterior ===
St Cuthbert's is constructed of dark red brick with sandstone dressings in the Perpendicular style. The roofs are slate. The plan consists of a west tower, a nave with aisles to the north and south, to the east, a chancel and a vestry north of the chancel. There is a small porch at the west end of the south aisle.

The tower has diagonal buttresses and three stages. Its parapet is crenellated. It has two-light belfry louvres and a two-light west window. The aisles have three-light windows in the Perpendicular style and the nave clerestory has smaller two-light windows. There are two-light windows in the chancel and the east window is a large three-light window in the Arts and Crafts style. Like the tower, the aisle, nave, porch and chancel walls are crenellated.

=== Interior and fittings ===
The tower houses a ring of eight bells, hung in a wooden frame. The church includes monuments to the local Clifton family.

St Cuthbert's stained glass includes a window designed in 1860 by Hardman & Co., an 1874 window depicting the Mount of Olives by Morris & Co. as well as work by Charles Eamer Kempe, Jean-Baptiste Capronnier and Clayton and Bell.

== Churchyard and surroundings ==
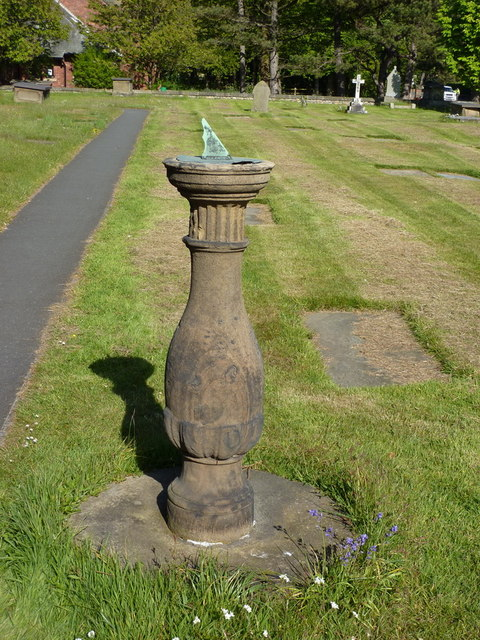
The Grade II listed sundial in the churchyard

Approximately 3 metres (9.8 ft) south-east of the church porch is a sandstone pedestal sundial, undated, but probably from the 18th century. It has a gadrooned base with a fluted collar. The plate and gnomon are copper and the plate is inscribed with "Dum spectes fugio". The sundial has been given a Grade II designation from English Heritage. The churchyard also contains the war graves of nine service personnel of World War I, and five of World War II.

About 30 metres (98 ft) north of the church there is a monument to the crew of the St Annes-on-Sea lifeboat Laura Janet, who drowned in 1886 in an attempted rescue mission of the Mexico. The monument is constructed of red sandstone and, 4 metres (13 ft) high, sits on a square plinth of two steps. It is carved with an image of the lifeboat and inscribed with the names of the lost crew members. The monument has also been given a Grade II designation.

The vicarage to the west of St Cuthbert's may date from 1836, and may have been designed by W. H. Hobden. It is constructed of red brick in Flemish bond with ashlar dressings in the Elizabethan style. Some features are Jacobean. The vicarage has been designated a Grade II listed building by English Heritage.

== See also ==
- Listed buildings in Lytham
- List of ecclesiastical works by Paley and Austin
