= Wilbraham =

Wilbraham may refer to:

== Surname ==
- Aaron Wilbraham (born 1979), English professional footballer
- Elizabeth Wilbraham (1632–1705), English architectural patron, possible first woman architect
- Frances Wilbraham (1815–1905), English novelist
- George Wilbraham (1779–1852), English politician
- Henry Wilbraham (1825–1883), English mathematician
- Richard Wilbraham (1811–1900), British Army officer
- Roger Wilbraham (1553–1616), English lawyer, Solicitor-General for Ireland under Elizabeth I
- Roger Wilbraham (MP) (1743–1829), British Member of Parliament, bibliophile, antiquary, local historian and a patron of science and the arts

== Given name ==
- Wilbraham Lennox (1830-1897), English recipient of the Victoria Cross
- Wilbraham Liardet (1799-1878), Australian hotelier and historian
- Wilbraham Spencer Tollemache (1807–1890), English soldier and High Sheriff
- Wilbraham Tollemache, 6th Earl of Dysart (1739–1821), British politician
- Wilbraham Tollemache, 2nd Baron Tollemache (1832–1904), British politician

== Places ==
- Wilbraham Almshouses (disambiguation), founded by members of the Wilbraham family
- Wilbraham, Massachusetts, American town
  - Wilbraham (CDP), Massachusetts, the central village in the town
- Great Wilbraham, village in Cambridgeshire, England
- Little Wilbraham, village in Cambridgeshire, England
- The Wilbraham, an apartment building in Manhattan, New York City

=== See also ===
- Edward Bootle-Wilbraham (disambiguation)
