= Derby Dilly =

- Leader: Lord Stanley
- Founded: May 1834
- Dissolved: December 1837 - Early 1838
- Split from: Whigs
- Merged into: Conservatives
- Ideology: Progressive Conservatism; Anti-Radicalism; Pro-Established Church
- Religion: Church of England

The Derby Dilly was a name given to a group of dissident Whigs who split from the main party under the leadership of Edward, Lord Stanley on the issue of the reorganisation of the Church of Ireland in 1834. Stanley and three others resigned from the cabinet of Lord Grey on this particular issue but other factors included their fear that the Whigs were appeasing their radical and Irish allies with further reforms.

The group's name 'Derby Dilly' is a reference to Stanley being the heir of the Earl of Derby. They were also called the 'Stanleyites'.

== Formation ==
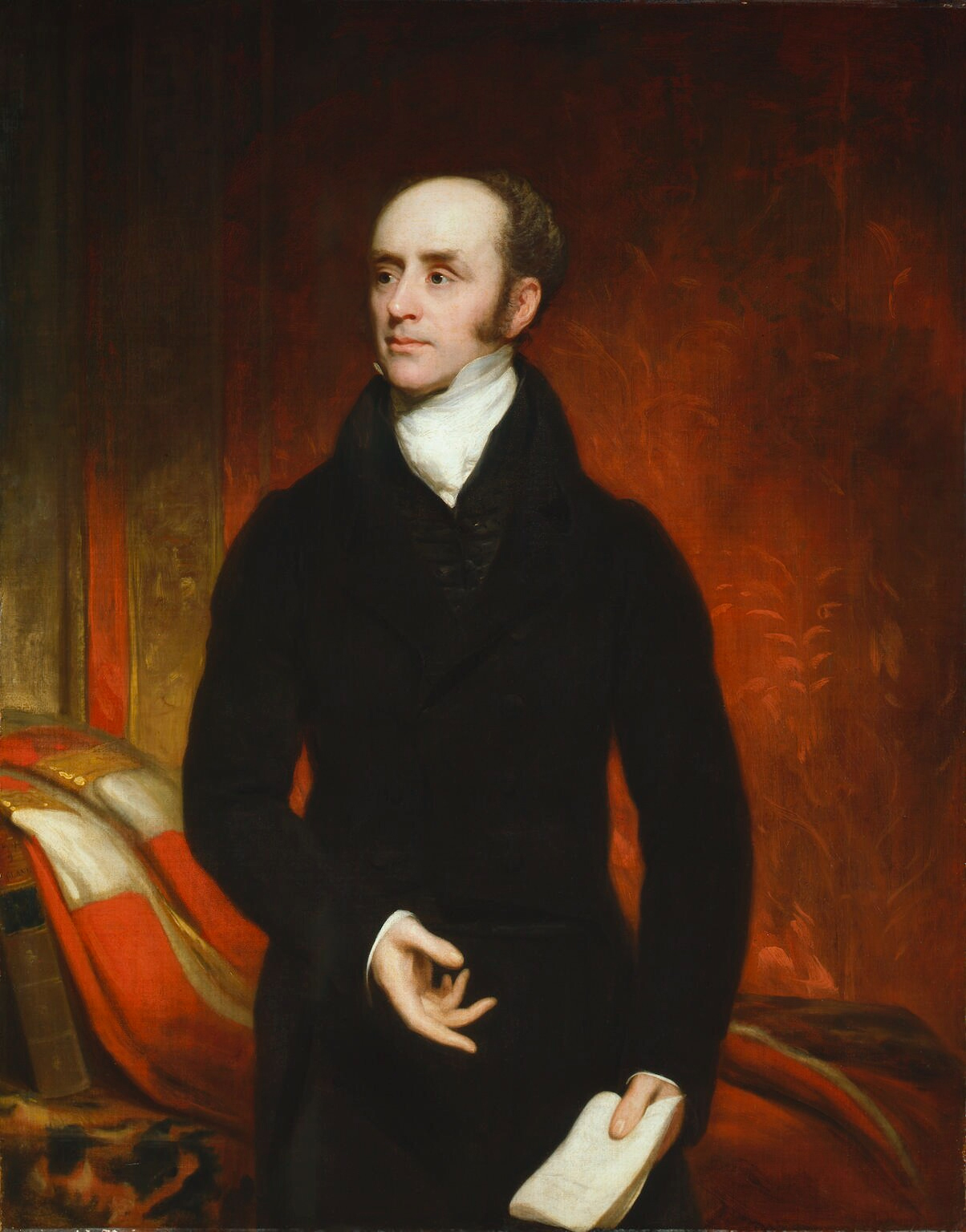
Portrait of Earl Grey by Thomas Phillips, 1820. Grey was the Whig Prime Minister between 1830 and 1834.

In 1830 Lord Grey had formed a government that had achieved political success by passing the Reform Act 1832 and abolishing slavery in the British Empire. However, it was an unstable coalition composed of Whigs, Canningites, Radicals, Irish Repealers and Tory mavericks. It had achieved a crushing electoral victory in 1832 against a demoralised Tory party but then quickly fell factional fighting. Lord John Russell wanted to extend the cause of reform to other areas of governance but others like Lord Stanley feared the growth of radicalism and in particular the influence of the Irish Repealers led by Daniel O'Connell. In May 1834, the pressure became too great and Stanley, with Earl of Ripon, Sir James Graham and The Duke of Richmond resigned from the cabinet on the issue of proposed changes to the structure and finances of the Church of Ireland.

Preferring to call themselves 'Moderate Whigs' or just 'Moderates', Stanley and his immediate cohorts including Graham and Francis Burdett, at first, remained on the government benches in the House of Commons. They were at first known unofficially as the 'Stanleyites', as they seemed more of an old-style parliamentary faction that was familiar in British politics from the 18th and early 19th centuries. However, the group soon received a new name from its political opponents to which they are now best remembered: 'The Derby Dilly'.

It was an allusion to a type of stagecoach called the 'Derby Dilly' (short for 'Diligence') and referred to Stanley's hereditary family title 'Earl of Derby'. Remembering Stanley's remark that when he had left the cabinet that it had led to an 'upsetting of the ministerial coach', the Irish nationalist leader Daniel O'Connell labelled the group the 'Derby Dilly', with a clever reference to the lines of a poem by George Canning and others, 'The Loves of the Triangles'. It had been a work of parody, actually attacking the works of Erasmus Darwin (grandfather of Charles Darwin) and had the lines 'Still down thy steep, romantic Ashbourne, glides The Derby dilly carrying six insides'.

== Failure to create a centre grouping ==
The idea of an erratic coach, with Stanley driving the horses, was quickly picked up by others, and the name stuck to the group. He already had a reputation as the 'Prince Rupert of Debate', a man who could lead his followers into an attack but was unable to rally them afterward. As a result, it was difficult to estimate the number of MPs who were actually part of the 'Dilly'. It is possible that they then numbered up to 70, but they lacked a core set of political beliefs or attitudes. Many of them still remained uncertain whether to go back to the Whigs, join the Tories or attempt to create a third political force. Some political observers wondered if the 'Dilly' (or at least those identified solidly with Stanley) really numbered only half a dozen MPs at most.

Despite his growing estrangement from the Whigs, Stanley remained on good terms with his former party leader, Earl Grey. In November 1834, following the resignation of The Viscount Melbourne, Sir Robert Peel invited Stanley (now Lord Stanley) and others in the 'Dilly' to join his minority Tory government. Stanley declined but made it obvious that he was finding himself in general agreement with Peel's attempt to form an administration.

In December 1834, Stanley decided that he needed to at least define a set of ideas to distinguish his group from the other parties and factions in the House of Commons. In a speech at Glasgow University that was subsequently dubbed 'The Knowsley Creed', after the Stanley family's ancestral home Knowsley Hall, near Liverpool, Stanley gave the student audience an outline of his political beliefs.

Besides affirming his staunch support of the established church and opposition to 'destructive reform', Stanley still signalled his political belief that it was not possible to reverse the Reform Act 1832 or undertake a purely reactionary domestic agenda.

'The machine must move forward for good or evil – for it cannot be stopped; like the fire it may purify, if properly kindled by a skilful hand, but if it should be impetuously and recklessly accelerated, destruction and overwhelming wreck must be the inevitable consequences'.

However, Stanley had been pre-empted by Peel three days earlier, on 8 December 1834. Peel had then issued an election address to his constituent, later dubbed the Tamworth Manifesto, which covered much of the same political and religious ground as Stanley's speech. Now usually known as a founding political ideology for what was to become the Conservative Party, it too said that Peel's party would support reform to correct 'abuses' if necessary and marked a contrast to the earlier old Toryism that had appeared to be opposed to all change. It also meant that in practice, the 'Derby Dilly' with its 'Knowsley Creed' and the Conservatives' 'Tamworth Manifesto' were largely equivalent, described by some as 'two sides of the same coin'.

== Merger with Conservative Party ==
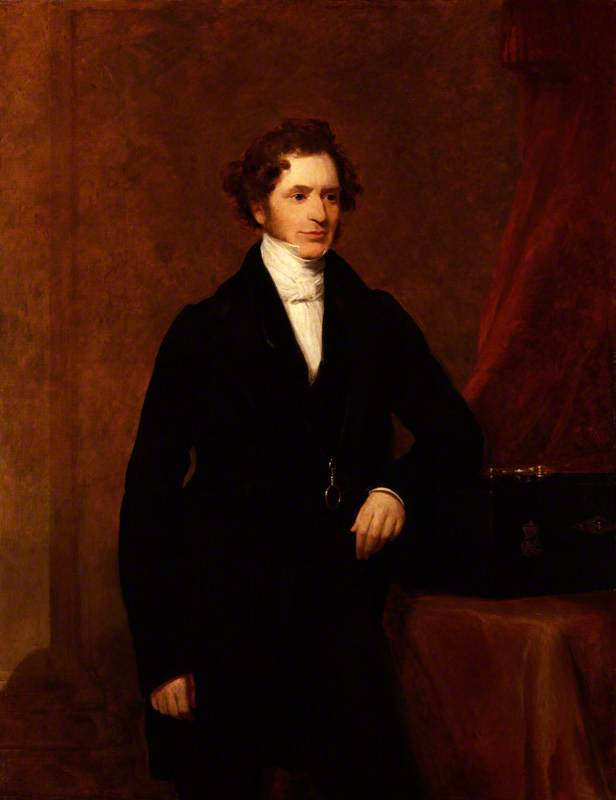
Portrait of the Earl of Derby by Frederick Richard Say, 1844. Derby, then Lord Stanley, was the effective leader of the group

Though they made electoral gains in the 1835 General Election, Peel's government remained a minority in the House of Commons. For the Derby Dilly, the election saw its members briefly attempt to forward their own candidates for election but apparently, there were no recruits to their diminishing band. However, surprisingly, Stanley thought he still had at least 86 supporters in January 1835 and described his band to a supporter as a 'corps de reserve', which King William IV could call upon 'in case of accidents' (to form a government if the monarch had enough of the Tory-Conservatives and Whig-Radical blocs). Though Stanley may have had in mind King George III's example of appointing William Pitt the Younger as Prime Minister in 1783, in the end, it was his 'reserve' that crumbled away, and those who were left by March 1835 (between 30 and 40) were still unable to agree even to vote the same way on a given debate.

By now, Lord Stanley was clearly leaning towards the Conservative Party. Any remote possibility of returning to the Whigs was scuttled by the Lichfield House Compact by which the Irish Repealers, Whigs and Radicals agreed to vote out Peel's government. That soon happened and left the 'Derby Dilly' nowhere else to go but to support Peel. When Peel resigned as Prime Minister in April 1835, the King invited not Stanley but Melbourne and the Whigs to form a new government, and Stanley received no invitation to rejoin the Whig fold.

For a brief period, as a measure of the looseness of political labels at the time, there was talk of a 'Liberal and Conservative Party' combining Stanley, Graham, Peel and even Lord Grey, but it came to nothing. Instead, there was a steady drift of MPs from the old pro-reform coalition to the Conservatives: some who had originally joined Stanley's group and others who went over independently. One estimate puts that number at least 50 MPs switching political allegiance between 1835 and 1841.

For Stanley (now Lord Stanley) and the remaining 'Derby Dilly' supporters (about 20 MPs in by 1837), there was now a staged progression across to the Conservatives. That is best illustrated by Stanley's own movement across the political spectrum. In 1836, he resigned from the Whig-supporting 'Brooks's Club', officially because his old political enemy Daniel O'Connell had become a member, and by the next elections, in 1837, the remaining Stanleyites were reliant on Conservative support to get back into parliament. In November 1837 Stanley and Graham joined other Conservative MPs at a meeting prior to the opening of the new Parliament and in December, they had officially joined them and sat with Peel on the Opposition Front Bench. Lord Stanley finally sealed his new Conservative identity by becoming a member of the Tory 'Holy of Holies', the Conservative supporting Carlton Club.

The remaining 'Derby Dilly' MPs were soon absorbed into the main Conservative Party. They included Lord George Bentinck, who was later better known for his alliance with Benjamin Disraeli in the 1840s against Peel on the issue of repealing the Corn Laws. Despite their Whig origins, Stanley, Bentinck and the former Radical Disraeli would ironically go on to break with Peel and take two thirds of his former party with them to recreate a new Conservative Party.
