= Richard Wilbraham =

General Sir Richard Wilbraham KCB
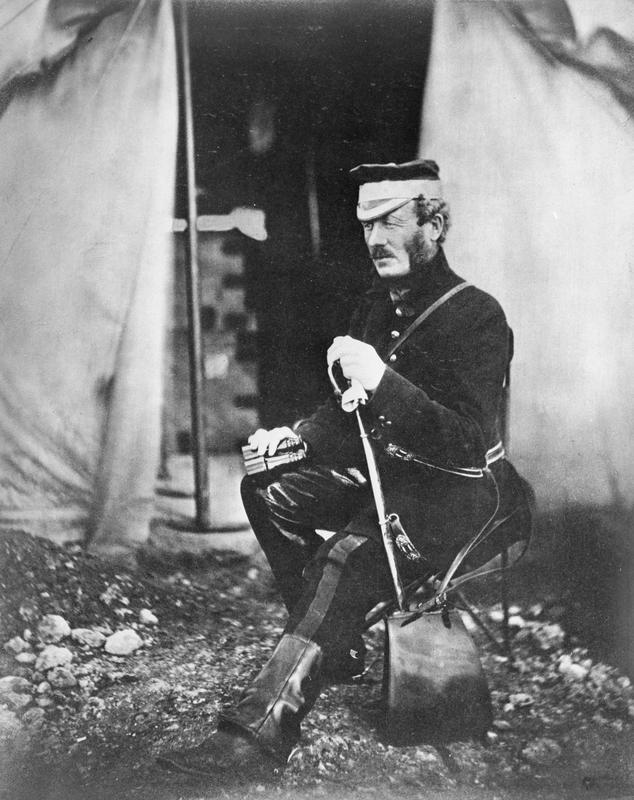
- Colonel Richard Wilbraham, CB, outside his tent
- Born: 12 April 1811; Scholar Green, Cheshire
- Died: 30 April 1900 (aged 89)
- Spouse: Elizabeth Frances Egerton
- Military career
- Allegiance: United Kingdom
- Branch: British Army
- Rank: General
- Conflicts: Syrian War; Crimean War
- Awards: Knight Commander of the Order of the Bath

General Sir Richard Wilbraham KCB (12 April 1811 – 30 April 1900) was a British Army officer who became colonel of the Royal Fusiliers (City of London Regiment).

== Early life ==
He was a son of Randle Bootle-Wilbraham (1773–1861) of Rode Hall and, his second wife, Sibylla Egerton. Among his siblings were Charlotte Wilbraham (wife of Francis Cradock Twemlow) and the novelist Frances Wilbraham.

His maternal grandparents were Philip Egerton, and Mary Eyles (a daughter of Sir Francis Haskins Eyles-Stiles), and among his maternal family were uncles Sir John Grey Egerton, 8th Baronet and Sir Philip Grey Egerton, 9th Baronet. His paternal grandparents were Richard Wilbraham-Bootle, MP for Chester, and the former Mary Bootle (daughter and heiress of Robert Bootle of Lathom House). His uncle was Edward Bootle-Wilbraham, 1st Baron Skelmersdale.

== Career ==
In the mid-1830s, Captain Wilbraham was attached to the Persian army to instruct local riflemen. The account of his travels in the lands between the Caspian and the Black Sea, including Georgia and the Caucasus, was published in London in 1839.

Wilbraham then served in the Syrian War. Promoted to major in the 7th Regiment of foot, Wilbraham served as Adjutant General of the 2nd Division during the Crimean War. He was promoted to lieutenant colonel in February 1855 and to colonel in August 1855. He also served as colonel of the Royal Fusiliers (City of London Regiment) taking up the post in 1881.

== Personal life ==
On 24 November 1846, Wilbraham was married to his cousin, Elizabeth Frances Egerton (1821–1849), a daughter of Sibella (née Boswell) Egerton and William Egerton of Gresford Lodge, Denbighshire. Before her death, they were the parents of one surviving daughter:

- Katherine Frances Wilbraham (c. 1842–1945), who married Sir George Barrington Baker Wilbraham, 5th Baronet, a son of Sir George Baker, 3rd Baronet and Mary Isabella Sutton.

Wilbraham lived at Rode Hall and died on 30 April 1900.

=== Descendants ===
Through his daughter Katherine, he was a grandfather of Sibylla Frances Baker Wilbraham (wife of The Ven. Percy Barnabas Emmet, Archdeacon of Nandyal), Sir Philip Wilbraham Baker Wilbraham, 6th Baronet (1875–1957), an ecclesiastical lawyer and administrator.

Military offices
Preceded by Sir Richard Airey	Colonel of the Royal Fusiliers (City of London Regiment); 1881–1900	Succeeded by Sir Geoffrey Barton
Preceded by Charles Crutchley	Colonel of the 80th Regiment of Foot (Staffordshire Volunteers); 1875–1881	Succeeded by Regiment amalgamated with the 38th (1st Staffordshire) Regiment of Foot
