= Edward Smith-Stanley, 14th Earl of Derby =

British statesman (1799–1869)

The Right Honourable The Earl of Derby KG GCMG PC PC (Ire)
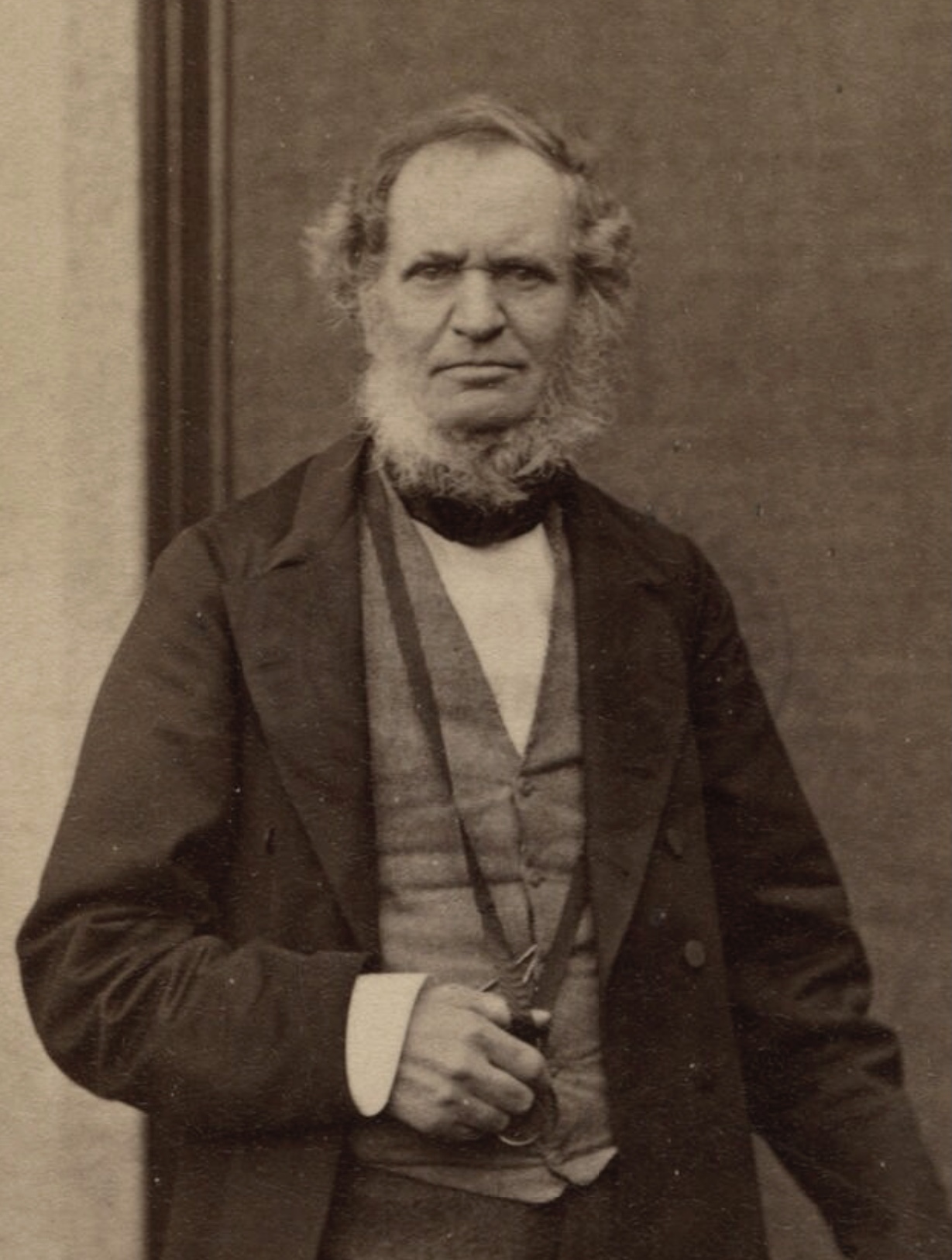
- Lord Derby c. 1867, W. & D. Downey

Prime Minister of the United Kingdom
- In office 28 June 1866 – 25 February 1868
- Monarch: Victoria
- Preceded by: The Earl Russell
- Succeeded by: Benjamin Disraeli
- In office 20 February 1858 – 11 June 1859
- Monarch: Victoria
- Preceded by: The Viscount Palmerston
- Succeeded by: The Viscount Palmerston
- In office 23 February 1852 – 17 December 1852
- Monarch: Victoria
- Preceded by: Lord John Russell
- Succeeded by: The Earl of Aberdeen

Secretary of State for War and the Colonies
- In office 3 September 1841 – 23 December 1845
- Prime Minister: Robert Peel
- Preceded by: Lord John Russell
- Succeeded by: William Ewart Gladstone
- In office 3 April 1833 – 5 June 1834
- Prime Minister: The Earl Grey
- Preceded by: The Viscount Goderich
- Succeeded by: Thomas Spring Rice

Chief Secretary for Ireland
- In office 29 November 1830 – 29 March 1833
- Prime Minister: The Earl Grey
- Preceded by: Sir Henry Hardinge
- Succeeded by: Sir John Hobhouse

Personal details
- Born: 29 March 1799 Knowsley Hall, Knowsley, Lancashire, England
- Died: 23 October 1869 (aged 70) Knowsley Hall, Knowsley, Lancashire, England
- Party: Conservative
- Other political affiliations: Whig (before 1841)
- Spouse: Emma Bootle-Wilbraham (m. 1825)
- Children: 3, including Edward, 15th Earl of Derby and Frederick, 16th Earl of Derby
- Parents: Edward Smith-Stanley, 13th Earl of Derby; Charlotte Margaret Hornby
- Education: Christ Church, Oxford

Edward George Geoffrey Smith-Stanley, 14th Earl of Derby (29 March 1799 – 23 October 1869), known as Lord Stanley from 1834 to 1851, was a British statesman and Conservative politician who served three times as Prime Minister of the United Kingdom. To date, he is the longest-serving leader of the Conservative Party (1846–68). He is one of only four British prime ministers to have three or more separate periods in office. However, his ministries each lasted less than two years and totalled three years and 280 days. Derby introduced the state education system in Ireland, and reformed Parliament.

Historian Frances Walsh has written that it was Derby:

who educated the party and acted as its strategist to pass the last great Whig measure, the 1867 Reform Act. It was his greatest achievement to create the modern Conservative Party in the framework of the Whig constitution, though it was Disraeli who laid claim to it.

Scholars long ignored his role but in the 21st century rank him highly among all British prime ministers.

== Early life and education ==
Edward Smith-Stanley was born on 19 March 1799 at Knowsley Hall, Lancashire. He was the eldest son of Edward Smith-Stanley, 13th Earl of Derby, and his wife (and first cousin) Charlotte Margaret Hornby. He was educated at Eton and at Christ Church, Oxford.

Stanley's ancestors were Kings of Man from 1405 and later Lords of Man. Thomas Stanley, 1st Earl of Derby, switched sides at the Battle of Bosworth and placed the crown of the fallen King Richard III upon the head of Henry Tudor.

== Early political career, 1822–1852 ==
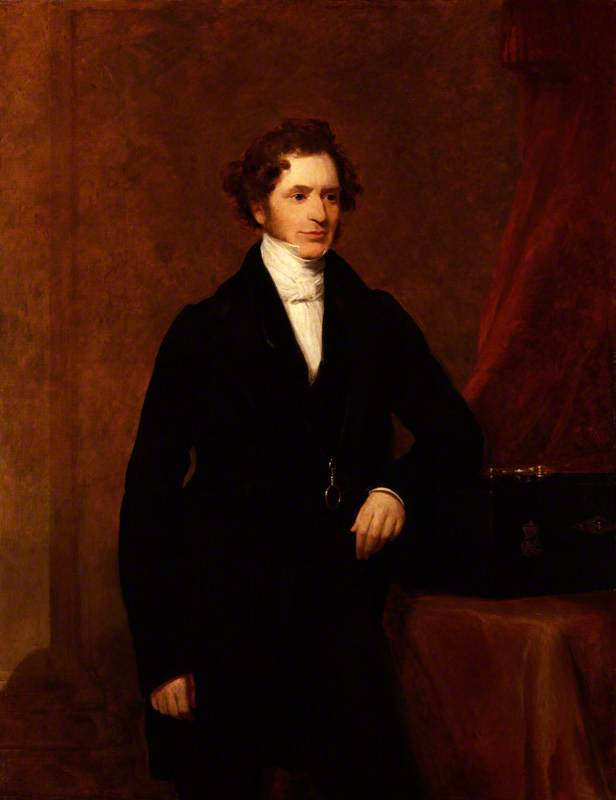
Portrait of the Earl of Derby by Frederick Richard Say, 1844

In 1822 Edward Stanley, as he was then, was elected to Parliament in the rotten borough of Stockbridge as a Whig, the traditional party of his family. In 1824, however, he alienated some of his Whig colleagues by voting against Joseph Hume's motion for an investigation into the established Protestant Church of Ireland. He lost his seat in 1826. When the Whigs returned to power in 1830, Stanley became Chief Secretary for Ireland in Lord Grey's Government, and entered the Cabinet in 1831. As Chief Secretary Stanley pursued a series of coercive measures which frequently brought him into conflict with the Lord Lieutenant of Ireland, Lord Anglesey. In October 1831, Stanley wrote the Stanley Letter, to Augustus FitzGerald, 3rd Duke of Leinster, establishing the system of National Education in Ireland. This letter remains today the legal basis for the predominant form of primary education in Ireland. In 1833, Stanley moved up to the more important position of Secretary of State for War and the Colonies, overseeing the passage of the Abolition of Slavery Bill.

Stanley, a religiously devout Anglican, broke with the ministry over the reform of the Anglican Church of Ireland in 1834 and resigned from the government. He then formed a group called the "Derby Dilly" and attempted to chart a middle course between what they saw as the increasingly radical Whiggery of Lord John Russell and the conservatism of the Tories. Tory leader Sir Robert Peel's turn to the centre with the 1834 Tamworth Manifesto, published three days before Stanley's "Knowsley Creed" speech, robbed the Stanleyites of much of the uniqueness of their programme.

The term "Derby Dilly" was coined by Irish Nationalist leader Daniel O'Connell. Besides Stanley, the other principal members of the Dilly were Sir James Graham, who had resigned as First Lord of the Admiralty; Lord Ripon, who had resigned as Lord Privy Seal; and the Duke of Richmond, who had resigned as Postmaster General. These four ministers had come from notably different political backgrounds—Stanley and Graham were old Whigs, Ripon was a former Canningite Tory prime minister, while Richmond was an arch-conservative Tory who had incongruously found himself in the Grey cabinet.

Although they did not participate in Peel's short-lived 1835 ministry, over the next several years they gradually merged into Peel's Conservative Party, with several members of the "Derby Dilly" taking prominent positions in Peel's second ministry. Joining the Conservatives, Stanley again served as Colonial Secretary in Peel's second government in 1841. In 1844 he was summoned to the House of Lords as Lord Stanley of Bickerstaffe in his father's Barony of Stanley by a Writ of acceleration. He broke with the Prime Minister again in 1845, this time over the repeal of the Corn Laws, and managed to bring the majority of the Conservative Party with him (including, among others, the young Benjamin Disraeli). He thereafter led the protectionist faction of the Conservative Party. In the House of Lords, on 23 November 1847, he accused the Irish Catholic clergy of using the confessional to encourage lawlessness and crime. This was disputed in a series of letters by the coadjutor Bishop of Derry, Edward Maginn. In 1851 he succeeded his father as Earl of Derby.

The party system was in a state of flux when the Conservatives left office in 1846, the outstanding issues being the question of Ireland and the unresolved franchise. The protectionists had a core of leaders, of whom Derby was a leading light.

== Premierships, 1852–1869 ==
He is the only modern-era prime minister who never enjoyed a parliamentary majority. In his private diary, the Earl of Malmesbury in 1857 commented on Derby's failure to exploit the press:

Lord Derby has never been able to realise the sudden growth and power of the Political Press, for which he has no partiality, which feeling is reciprocated by its members. In these days this is a fatal error in men who wish to obtain public power and distinction. Lord Derby is too proud a man to flatter anybody, even his greatest friends and equals, much less those of whom he knows nothing.

=== First government ===
1852 illustration of Derby

Derby formed a minority government in February 1852 following the collapse of Lord John Russell's Whig Government. In this new ministry, Benjamin Disraeli was appointed Chancellor of the Exchequer. With many senior Conservative ministers having followed Peel, Derby was forced to appoint many new men to the office of the Cabinet, only three were pre-existing Privy Counsellors. When the aged Duke of Wellington, by then very deaf, heard the list of inexperienced cabinet ministers being read aloud in the House of Lords, he gave the government its nickname by shouting "Who? Who?". From then this government would be known as the "Who? Who?" ministry.

Traditionally Derby's ministries were thought in hindsight to have been dominated by Disraeli. However, recent research suggests that this was not always the case, especially in the government's conduct of foreign policy. There, Derby and his Foreign Secretaries, Lord Malmesbury and later his son Lord Stanley, pursued a course of action that was aimed at building up power through financial strength, seeking to avoid wars at all costs, co-operating with other powers, and working through the Concert of Europe to resolve diplomatic problems. This contrasted sharply with the policy of military strength and prestige that Disraeli would later pursue, and Derby's very different take on foreign policy could be seen as the precursor of "splendid isolation", as well as the diplomatic settlement of Europe pursued by later Conservatives in the late 19th century and the 1930s.

In the general election of June 1852, the Conservative party under Derby and Disraeli won only 330 seats in the House of Commons—42.9% of the total. Although the Whigs actually won fewer seats—292 seats—there were several small groups in Parliament that might be willing to side with the Whigs on particular issues, including the 38 Conservative members of Parliament who were Peelites, who had already joined with the Whigs in June 1846 to repeal the Corn Laws; the 113 members who were Free Traders and who were interested in eliminating all tariffs on consumer goods; and the 63 members of the Irish Brigade who were interested in the independence of Ireland and Tenant's Rights for Irish tenants. Immediately following the election in June 1852, none of these small groups were willing to work with the Whigs to form a government. Accordingly, the Earl of Derby was invited to form a minority government. Derby did so and appointed Disraeli as the new Chancellor of the Exchequer.

As with all minority governments, Derby's minority government had a difficult time governing. Their main preoccupation was avoiding any issue which might cause any of the government's small components to go over to Whigs and cause a "no confidence" vote. However, the real issues facing Parliament could not be postponed for long, and when Disraeli submitted his first budget to Parliament in December 1852, it proved so unpopular with the Peelites, the Free Traders, and the Irish Brigade that it was voted down in a "no confidence" vote. As a result, Derby's minority government fell, making way for a Peelite–Whig coalition under Lord Aberdeen. When Aberdeen's administration fell in 1855, Queen Victoria asked Derby to form a government. Much to the consternation of some sections of his party, including Disraeli, Derby declined this offer, believing that he would be in a position to form a stronger government after a short-lived failed administration led by one of the Conservative Party's rivals such as Lord John Russell or Lord Palmerston.

=== Second government ===
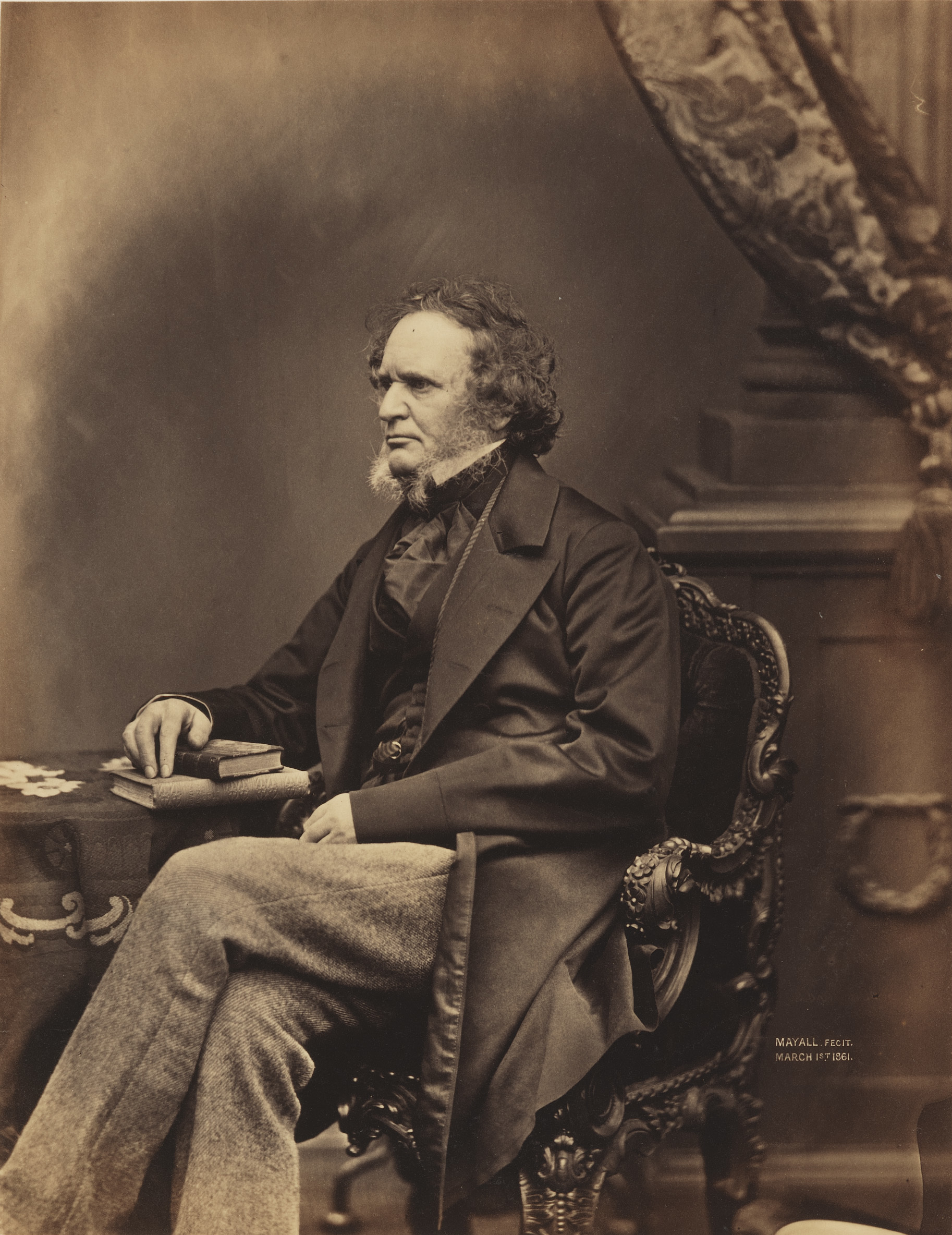
Derby in 1861

In 1858, Derby formed another minority government upon the resignation of Lord Palmerston following a parliamentary defeat to an opposition motion which, in the context of a failed plot to assassinate Napoleon III of France, charged that "the ministry had admitted they sheltered assassins". Disraeli was again at the Exchequer and Leader of the Commons. Among the notable achievements of this administration was the end of the British East India Company following the Indian Rebellion of 1857, which brought India under direct British control for the first time. Once again the government was short-lived, resigning after only one year, having narrowly lost a vote of no-confidence brought by Lord Hartington on behalf of various Whig and Radical factions which had coalesced at the Willis's Rooms meetings in St James's Street to mark the birth of the Liberal Party. In July 1859, Derby was appointed a Knight of the Garter.

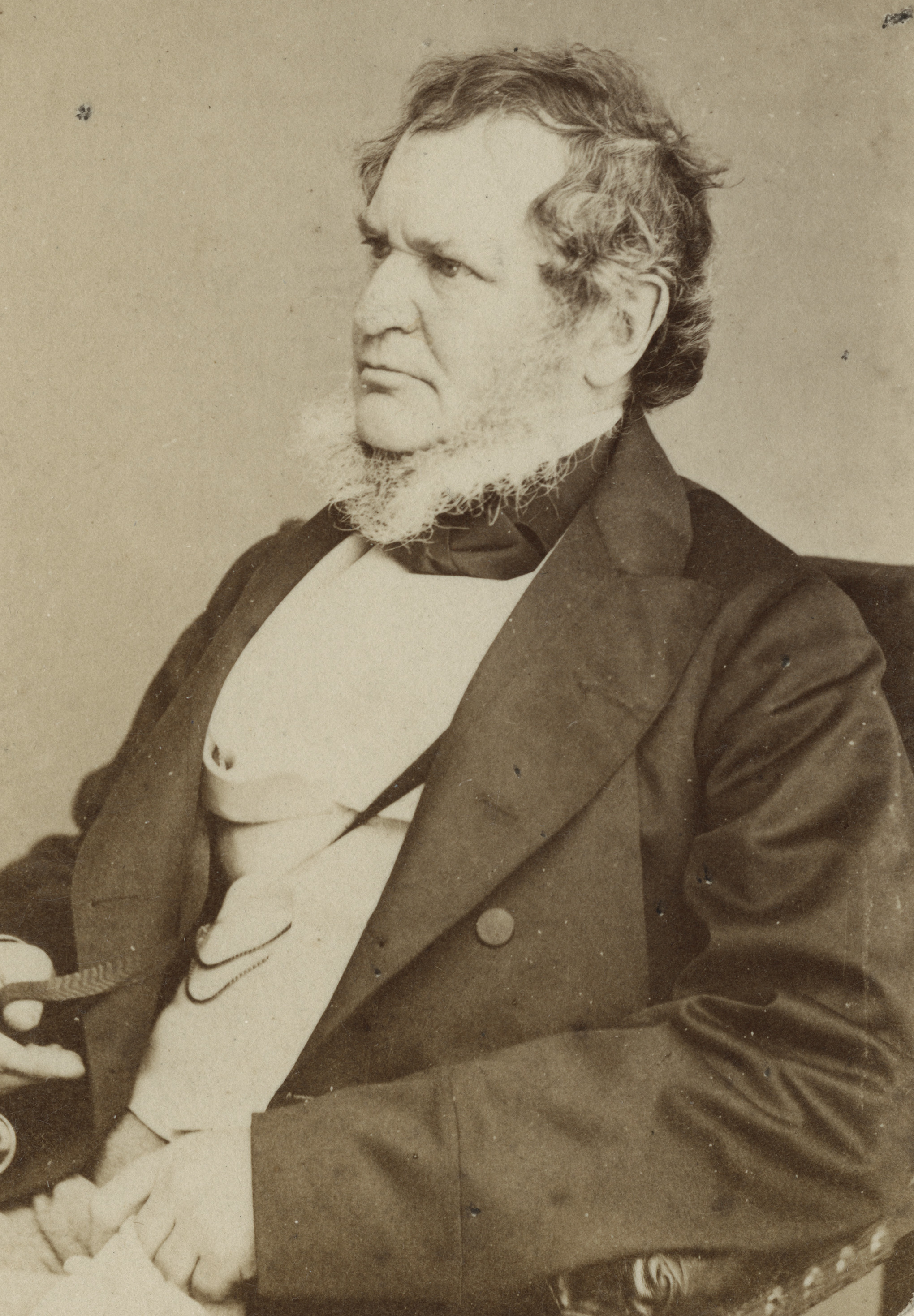
Lord Derby in 1865

Back in opposition, Derby pursued a strategy of trying to lure the Prime Minister, Lord Palmerston, away from his more radical colleagues, Lord John Russell in particular. This tactic was thwarted by Russell's declining influence and by Chancellor of the Exchequer William Ewart Gladstone's 1861 budget which united the cabinet and increased divisions amongst the Conservatives. Palmerston continued as Prime Minister until his death in 1865, when he was succeeded by the ineffective Russell.

=== Third government ===
Derby returned to power for the third and last time in 1866, following the collapse of Lord Russell's second government after its failed attempt at further electoral reform. Once again, Disraeli was a leading figure. This administration was particularly notable for the passage of the Reform Act 1867, which greatly expanded the suffrage but which provoked the resignation of three cabinet ministers including the Secretary for India and future three-time Prime Minister, Lord Cranborne (later Lord Salisbury). In early 1868, Derby retired from political life on medical advice, leaving Disraeli to succeed him. In 1869, he was appointed a Knight Grand Cross of the Order of St Michael and St George in recognition of his former role as Secretary of State for War and the Colonies. He was appointed Honorary Colonel of the 1st Lancashire Rifle Volunteer Corps on 10 September 1862, beginning a family connection with the regiment that endured for over 100 years.

Derby's tenure of 22 years as party leader still stands as the longest in Conservative Party history and indeed the history of any other political party in British history. Only Labour's Clement Attlee came close, at 20 years.

During Derby's third premiership, a factory Act was passed in 1866 “dealing with uncleanliness, inadequate ventilation, and overcrowding in factories.” The provisions of this Act were extended to other trades in 1867, and as a result of this Act "1,500,000 women and children were admitted to the benefits of the factory laws." That same year an Act was passed regulating the hours of women workers in every workshop. The Master and Servant Act 1867 was also introduced during his final term.

== Marriage and issue ==
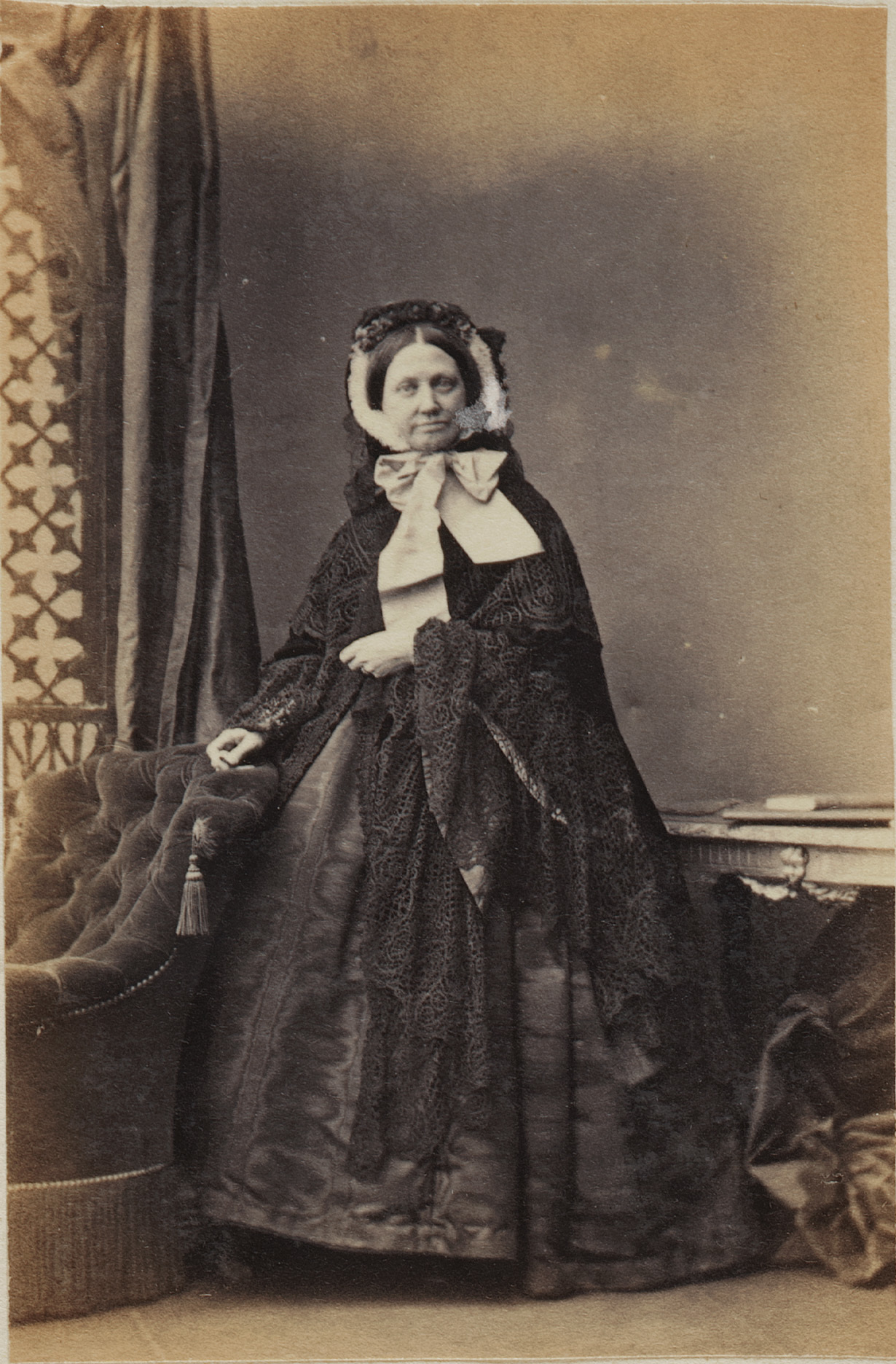
The Countess of Derby

Stanley married The Hon. Emma Bootle-Wilbraham, the second daughter of Edward Bootle-Wilbraham, 1st Baron Skelmersdale, on 31 May 1825. They had six children, half of whom survived to adulthood:

- Edward Henry Stanley, 15th Earl of Derby (21 July 1826 – 21 April 1893), married Lady Mary Sackville-West (daughter of 5th Earl De La Warr) on 5 July 1870, without issue
- Ferdinand Charles (26 – 27 July 1829), died in infancy
- Daughter (born and died 3 May 1832), died in infancy
- Lady Emma Charlotte Stanley (25 December 1835 – 23 August 1928). She married Colonel Sir Patrick Chetwynd-Talbot KCB (son of Charles Chetwynd-Talbot, 2nd Earl Talbot) on 11 October 1860. They had eight children.
- Hon. Charles Stanley (born and died 6 August 1838), died in infancy
- Frederick Arthur Stanley, 16th Earl of Derby (15 January 1841 – 14 June 1908), married Lady Constance Villiers (daughter of George Villiers, 4th Earl of Clarendon) on 31 May 1864. They had ten children.

== Death ==
Lord Derby died at Knowsley Hall on 23 October 1869 at the age of 70. The Countess of Derby died on 26 April 1876.

== Legacy ==
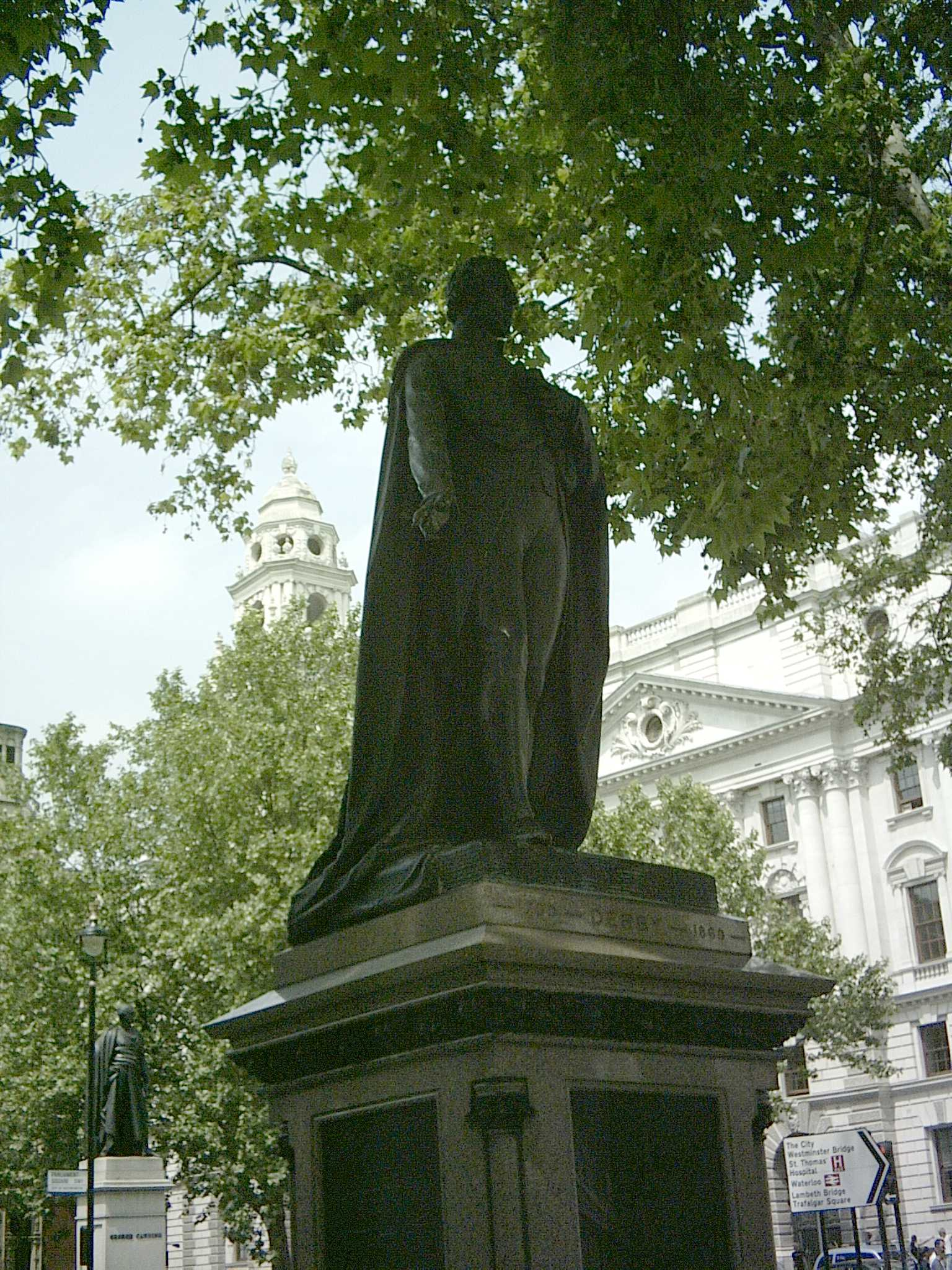
Statue in London's Parliament Square

Historian David Cannadine argues:

Although almost entirely forgotten today, Derby was one of the great figures of 19th-century British public, social and cultural life: he was a fine debater, a classical scholar of note and a significant patron of the turf; he was also an authentic grandee, with very rich, coal-bearing estates in Lancashire, and leader of the Conservative Party for an unrivalled span of 22 years.

Historian Frances Walsh has written:

Although he was the first politician to become prime minister three times and remains the longest-serving party leader in British history he has not received the recognition one would expect. As a landed aristocrat with Whig antecedents, literary tastes, and a passionate interest in shooting and the turf he seemed to represent an obsolete, amateur tradition in politics, while the mythologizing of Disraeli as the architect of conservative survival and success tended to cast him into the shadows. This neglect was compounded by the absence of an official biography and problems of access to the Derby archives for a century after his death. Recent Studies have done something to redress the balance… It was Derby who educated the party and acted as its strategist to pass the last great Whig measure, the 1867 Reform Act. It was his greatest achievement to create the modern Conservative Party in the framework of the Whig constitution, though it was Disraeli who laid claim to it.

The National School system in Ireland, the predominant form of primary school education, was unable to sustain the multi-denominational system set up by Stanley in the Stanley Letter. The letter had tried to deal with the seemingly intractable issue of different Christian religions living together in Ireland, but by the end of the century denominational schools had become the norm.

The former site of Fort Langley, British Columbia was renamed Derby by the Royal Engineers in 1858, apparently in honour of the Earl, who was British Prime Minister at the time. Stanley (sometimes referred to as "Port Stanley") on East Falkland, capital of the Falkland Islands, is named after Edward Smith-Stanley as are Port Stanley in Ontario, Canada (he did not visit his namesake but he had visited nearby Port Talbot, Ontario during his Canadian/American trip in 1824), as well as the area Stanley in Hong Kong. Stanley was Prime Minister when Queen Victoria opened Wellington College, in Berkshire, a tribute to the Duke of Wellington, where the boarding house Stanley is named after him. The County of Stanley, Queensland, Australia, is named after the Earl. Notably, it contains the important Australian city of Brisbane.

A library book about Smith-Stanley titled The Earl of Derby, written by George Saintsbury and published in 1892, was borrowed from the Newtown Library in Wellington, New Zealand, in March 1902 and returned in August 2020 (118 years later) after being discovered in Sydney, Australia. The book was described as being "in OK condition".

== Arms ==
Coat of arms of Edward Smith-Stanley, 14th Earl of Derby
Crest On a chapeau gules turned up ermine an eagle, wings extended, or, preying on an infant in its cradle proper, swaddled gules, the cradle laced or. Escutcheon Argent, on a bend azure three stags' heads caboshed or. Supporters Dexter, a griffin, wings elevated; sinister, a stag, each or, and ducally collared with line reflexed over the back azure. Motto Sans changer (Without changing). Orders The Most Noble Order of the Garter (KG).

== See also ==
- English translations of Homer § Derby
- List of statues and sculptures in Liverpool

== Notes and references ==
Parliament of the United Kingdom
Preceded by Joseph Foster Barham; John Foster-Barham	Member of Parliament for Stockbridge; 1822–1826; With: John Foster-Barham	Succeeded by Thomas Grosvenor; George Wilbraham
Preceded by Samuel Horrocks; Edmund Hornby	Member of Parliament for Preston; 1826–1830; With: John Wood	Succeeded by John Wood; Henry Hunt
Preceded by John Ramsbottom; Sir Hussey Vivian, Bt	Member of Parliament for Windsor; 1831–1832; With: John Ramsbottom	Succeeded by John Ramsbottom; Sir Samuel Brooke-Pechell, Bt
New constituency	Member of Parliament for North Lancashire; 1832–1844; With: John Wilson-Patten	Succeeded by John Wilson-Patten; John Talbot Clifton
Political offices
Preceded by R. W. Horton	Under-Secretary of State for War and the Colonies; 1827–1828	Succeeded by Lord Francis Leveson-Gower
Preceded by Sir Henry Hardinge	Chief Secretary for Ireland; 1830–1833	Succeeded by Sir John Hobhouse, Bt
Preceded by The Viscount Goderich	Secretary of State for War and the Colonies; 1833–1834	Succeeded by Thomas Spring Rice
Preceded by Lord John Russell	Secretary of State for War and the Colonies; 1841–1845	Succeeded by William Ewart Gladstone
Preceded by Lord John Russell	Prime Minister of the United Kingdom; 23 February 1852 – 17 December 1852	Succeeded by The Earl of Aberdeen
Preceded by The Marquess of Lansdowne	Leader of the House of Lords; 23 February 1852 – 17 December 1852	Succeeded by The Earl of Aberdeen
Preceded by The Viscount Palmerston	Prime Minister of the United Kingdom; 20 February 1858 – 11 June 1859	Succeeded by The Viscount Palmerston
Preceded by The Earl Granville	Leader of the House of Lords; 21 February 1858 – 11 June 1859	Succeeded by The Earl Granville
Preceded by The Earl Russell	Prime Minister of the United Kingdom; 28 June 1866 – 25 February 1868	Succeeded by Benjamin Disraeli
Preceded by The Earl Russell	Leader of the House of Lords; 28 June 1866 – 25 February 1868	Succeeded by The Earl of Malmesbury
Party political offices
Preceded by Sir Robert Peel, Bt	Leader of the Conservative Party; 1846–1868	Succeeded by Benjamin Disraeli
Preceded by The Duke of Wellington	Leader of the Conservative Party in the House of Lords; 1846–1868	Succeeded by The Earl of Malmesbury
Academic offices
Preceded by Henry Thomas Cockburn	Rector of the University of Glasgow; 1834–1836	Succeeded by Sir Robert Peel
Preceded by The Duke of Wellington	Chancellor of the University of Oxford; 1852–1869	Succeeded by The Marquess of Salisbury
Peerage of England
Preceded by Edward Smith-Stanley	Earl of Derby; 1851–1869	Succeeded by Edward Stanley
Peerage of the United Kingdom
Preceded by Edward Smith-Stanley	Baron Stanley of Bickerstaffe (writ in acceleration); 1844–1869	Succeeded by Edward Stanley
