= Frances Wilbraham =

British novelist

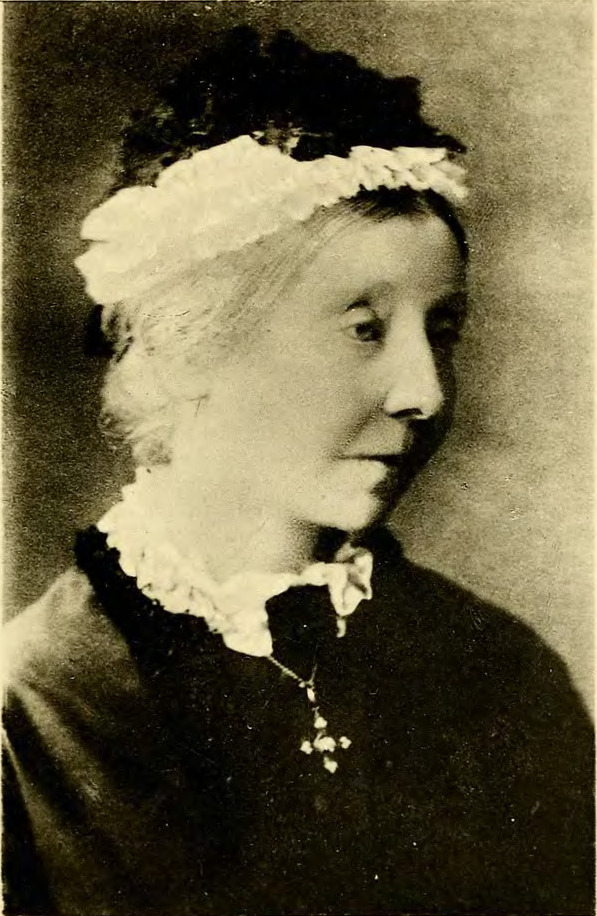
- Born: 30 June 1815; Rode Hall
- Died: 26 June 1905 (aged 89); Chester
- Occupation: Novelist
- Parent(s): Randle Bootle Wilbraham; Sibylla Egerton
- Family: Richard Wilbraham

Frances Maria Wilbraham (30 June 1815 – 26 June 1905) was a British novelist.

== Biography ==
Frances Maria Wilbraham was born on 30 June 1815 at Rode Hall, Cheshire, the fifth daughter of Randle Wilbraham of Rode Hall, son of Richard Wilbraham-Bootle, and Sibylla Egerton. Her brother was General Sir Richard Wilbraham KCB.

During the 1866 cholera epidemic in Chester, Frances and Emily Ayckbowm volunteered to run a hospital for cholera victims. Her work caused her to be dubbed the "Florence Nightingale of Chester" by Hugh Grosvenor, 1st Duke of Westminster.

Wilbraham wrote a number of works of historical fiction. She also wrote numerous stories for The Monthly Packet, edited by her friend Charlotte Yonge. Her recollections of the cholera epidemic were published as Streets and Lanes of a City (1871), initially under the name Amy Dutton.

Frances Maria Wilbraham died on 26 June 1905 in Chester.

== Bibliography ==
1. For and Against: or, Queen Margaret's Badge. A Domestic Chronicle of the Fifteenth Century. 2 vol. London: John W. Parker, 1858.
2. The Young Breton Volunteer: A Tale of 1851. 1 vol. London: Mozley and Co., 1860.
3. The Cheshire Pilgrims: or, Sketches of Crusading Life in the Thirteenth Century. 1 vol. London: John Morgan, 1862.
4. Not Clever, and Other Stories. 1 vol. London: Groombridge, 1864.
5. Phil Thorndyke's adventures, 1870s.
6. Streets and Lanes of a City, 1871.
7. Hal the Barge Boy: A Sketch from Life, 1883.
8. The sere and yellow leaf : thoughts and recollections for old and young, 1884.
9. What is Right, Comes Right. 1 vol. London: Joseph Masters, 1884.
