= Sir Charles Jenkinson, 10th Baronet =

British politician

Sir Charles Jenkinson, 10th Baronet (23 February 1779 – 6 March 1855), known as Charles Jenkinson until 1851, was a British politician.

== Background ==
Jenkinson was the son of Colonel John Jenkinson, Joint Secretary for Ireland, and great-grandson of Sir Robert Jenkinson, 2nd Baronet. His mother was Frances Harriet, daughter of Rear-Admiral of the Red John Barker, R.N. (1706–1776), and Ann Russell Charlton. Charles Jenkinson, 1st Earl of Liverpool, was his uncle, and Robert Jenkinson, 2nd Earl of Liverpool, Prime Minister of the United Kingdom in 1812–1827, was his first cousin.

== Political career ==
Jenkinson was returned to Parliament as one of two representatives for Dover in 1806, a seat he held until 1818. In 1851, at the age of 72, he succeeded his cousin Charles Jenkinson, 3rd Earl of Liverpool, as tenth Baronet, of Walcot and Hawkesbury.

== Family ==
Jenkinson died without male issue in March 1855, aged 76. He had married Katherine Campbell, a daughter of Walter Campbell of Shawfield; their daughters included:

- Katherine, who married Richard Samuel Guinness in 1833; they were the parents of Adelaide Guinness, wife of the first Earl of Iveagh
- Eleanor, wife of the 2nd Duc de Montebello

He was succeeded in the baronetcy by his nephew, George Jenkinson.

Parliament of the United Kingdom
Preceded by John Trevanion; John Spencer Smith	Member of Parliament for Dover; 1806–1818; With: Sir John Jackson, Bt	Succeeded by Sir John Jackson, Bt; Edward Bootle-Wilbraham
Baronetage of England
Preceded by Charles Jenkinson	Baronet (of Walcot and Hawkesbury); 1851–1855	Succeeded by George Jenkinson
