= Joseph Butterworth =

English law bookseller and politician

Joseph Butterworth (1770 – 30 June 1826) was an English law bookseller and politician.

== Life ==
He was son of the Rev. John Butterworth, a Baptist minister in Coventry, where he was born. At an early age he went to London, where he learned the law-book trade, and founded a large and lucrative establishment in Fleet Street, in which his nephew Henry Butterworth later worked.

Butterworth's house became a resort of the leading philanthropists of the day. There Lord Liverpool, John Shore, 1st Baron Teignmouth, William Wilberforce and Zachary Macaulay had discussions, and the first meetings of the British and Foreign Bible Society were held. Butterworth liberally supported many philanthropic and Christian institutions.

He was Member of Parliament for Coventry from 1812 to 1818, and for Dover from 1820 to 1826, and gave independent support to the government of the day. He was a broad-minded Wesleyan, and in August 1819 was appointed general treasurer of the Wesleyan Methodist Missionary Society, a post he retained until his death. He died at his house in Bedford Square, London, 30 June 1826, aged 56.

== Works ==
He was author of A General Catalogue of Law Books (1801).

Parliament of the United Kingdom
Preceded by William Mills; Peter Moore	Member of Parliament for Coventry; 1812–1818; With: Peter Moore	Succeeded by Edward Ellice; Peter Moore
Preceded by Sir John Jackson; Edward Bootle-Wilbraham	Member of Parliament for Dover; 1820–1826; With: Edward Bootle-Wilbraham	Succeeded by Charles Poulett Thomson; Edward Bootle-Wilbraham
