= Edward Bootle-Wilbraham =

Edward Bootle-Wilbraham may refer to:

- Edward Bootle-Wilbraham, 1st Baron Skelmersdale (1771–1853)
- Edward Bootle-Wilbraham, 1st Earl of Lathom (1837–1898)
- Edward Bootle-Wilbraham, 2nd Earl of Lathom (1864–1910)
