= Sir John Jackson, 1st Baronet =

British politician and businessman

Sir John Jackson Bt

Member of Parliament for Dover
- In office 1806–1820 Serving with Charles Jenkinson; Edward Bootle-Wilbraham
- Preceded by: John Trevanion; John Spencer Smith
- Succeeded by: Joseph Butterworth; Edward Bootle-Wilbraham

Director of the East India Company
- In office 1807–1810
- In office 1812–1815
- In office 1817–1820

Personal details
- Born: 30 December 1763 Kingston, Jamaica
- Died: 17 May 1820 (aged 56)
- Spouse: Charlotte Spry
- Parent(s): John Jackson; Hannah Coverley
- Relatives: Joseph Goreham (father-in-law)
- Occupation: Politician; Businessman

Sir John Jackson, 1st Baronet (30 December 1763 – 17 May 1820) was a British politician and businessman.

== Early life ==
John Jackson was born on 30 December 1763 at Kingston, Jamaica. He was the second son of John Jackson, a surgeon, and Hannah née Coverley. While little is known of Jackson's early life, he possibly was educated at Eton College from 1778. Jackson married Charlotte Spry, the daughter of Colonel Joseph Goreham, on 13 February 1797. The couple would go on to have four sons and two daughters.

== Mercantile career ==
At an early point in his adult life Jackson served as a ship's purser. In around 1795 he was appointed secretary to Vice-Admiral George Keith Elphinstone, the Commander-in-Chief, Cape of Good Hope, after the Invasion of the Cape Colony. Jackson was still serving at the Cape in 1797, by then having taken responsibility as a navy agent for prize money on the station. Continuing to work under Keith, by 1800 Jackson had returned to England and was managing Keith's prize money in concert with William Fullerton-Elphinstone, Keith's brother. Jackson and Fullerton-Elphinstone were also registered as merchants, with a headquarters in Chandos Street, Cavendish Square. The partnership had seemingly dissolved by 1802, but Jackson continued on as a merchant and agent, now in Broad Street. He often worked in partnership with the insurance broker John Petty Muspratt, and continued as a merchant in Broad Street for the rest of his life. In 1803 Jackson put himself forward as a candidate to fill an empty seat on the court of directors of the East India Company (EIC), citing his previous experiences, but later withdrew.

== Political career ==
Jackson was elected as member of parliament (MP) for Dover at the 1806 United Kingdom general election, having spent a considerable amount of his own money to ensure this. As the Whig candidate in the election he most likely owed his selection to Keith, whose brother-in-law was the Whig election manager William Adam. Jackson supported the Ministry of All the Talents until it fell, condemning votes against Catholic relief. In April 1807 he again stood to join the EIC court of directors and, with the support of EIC chairman Charles Grant, was successful. At the 1807 United Kingdom general election he stood to be returned for Dover, being opposed by two supporters of the Second Portland ministry. During his campaigning Jackson was forced to issue an affidavit that, despite his voting record on Catholic issues, he was not himself a Catholic. Jackson won the second of the two seats available for Dover, being beaten out by Charles Jenkinson by only six votes in a poll of over 1,200 people.

Parliament of the United Kingdom
Preceded by John Trevanion; John Spencer Smith	Member of Parliament for Dover; 1806–1820; With: Charles Jenkinson (to 1818); Edward Bootle-Wilbraham (from 1818)	Succeeded by Joseph Butterworth; Edward Bootle-Wilbraham
Baronetage of England
New creation	Baronet (of Arlsey, Bedfordshire); 1815–1820	Succeeded by Keith Alexander Jackson
