= John Trevanion (died 1810) =

British politician (1741–1810)

John Trevanion (c. 1740–1810) was a British politician who sat in the House of Commons for 32 years between 1774 and 1806.

Trevanion was the son of Rev. Hugh Trevanion, vicar of West Alvington, Devon. He became a London merchant, trading at 3 Bishopsgate Church Yard. In the middle of the eighteenth century, he took up residence at Dover. He married Elizabeth Boyd, daughter of Sir John Boyd, 1st Baronet, of Danson Park, Kent on 5 June 1773.

Trevanion became interested in standing for Parliament for the Dover constituency and when he started to campaign he promised that if he were elected as Member of Parliament, he would build and maintain a free school for Dover boys. He fought for the seat of Dover in January 1770 but was defeated. A school, for fifty sons of Dover freemen, was nevertheless established in 1771. Trevanion was beaten decisively at a by-election of April 1773 but at the 1774 general election he was returned unopposed for Dover.

Trevanion retained the seat in the 1780 general election but when he stood in the 1784 general election, supported by North who was lord warden of the Cinque Ports, he was badly beaten. At a by-election of 1789 he regained the seat and held it until 1806 when he came third in the poll.

Trevanion died on 21 April 1810.

Parliament of Great Britain
Preceded by Hon. Sir Joseph Yorke; Thomas Barret	Member of Parliament for Dover; 1774–1784; With: John Henniker	Succeeded by Robert Preston; Captain the Hon. James Luttrell
Preceded by Robert Preston; Captain the Hon. James Luttrell	Member of Parliament for Dover; 1789–1806; With: Robert Preston 1789-1790; Charles Small Pybus 1790-1802; John Spencer Smith 1802-1806	Succeeded by John Jackson; Charles Jenkinson
