= William Egerton =

British politician

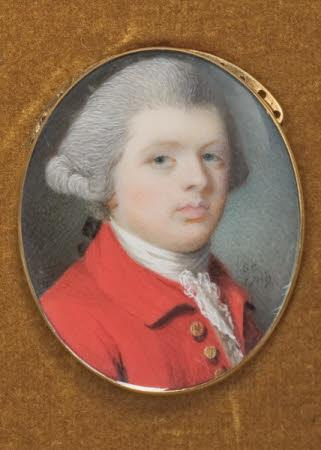
William Tatton (Egerton), 1769 portrait by Samuel Cotes

William Egerton (originally William Tatton; 1749–1806) was an English politician and a member of the Egerton family.

Egerton was the son of William Tatton and Hester, sister of Samuel Egerton, who was her brother's heiress. He changed his surname to his mother's on 9 July 1780.

Egerton represented as Member of Parliament the constituencies of Hindon, Newcastle-under-Lyme and Cheshire.

== Family ==
Egerton married four times:

- Frances Maria Fountayne, (d. 9 Jan 1777), daughter of the Very Rev. John Fountayne, Dean of York. They had two sons, one daughter.
- Mary Wilbraham Bootle, (15 Aug 1760 - 13 November 1784) daughter of Richard Wilbraham Bootle. They had three sons and one daughter. The second son of this marriage was Wilbraham Egerton.
- Anna Maria Armytage, (d. 4 Sept 1799), daughter of Sir George Armytage. They had one son.
- Charlotte Clara Payler, daughter of Thomas Watkinson Payler of Ileden Kent.

== Notes ==
Parliament of Great Britain
Preceded by Lloyd Kenyon; Nathaniel Wraxall	Member of Parliament for Hindon; 1784–1790; With: Edward Bearcroft	Succeeded by William Beckford; James Adams
Preceded by Sir Archibald Macdonald; John Leveson-Gower	Member of Parliament for Newcastle-under-Lyme; 1792–1800; With: Sir Archibald Macdonald 1792–1793; Sir Francis Ford 1793–1796; Edward Wilbraham Bootle 1796–1800	Parliament of the United Kingdom
Parliament of the United Kingdom
Parliament of Great Britain	Member of Parliament for Newcastle-under-Lyme; 1801–1802; With: Edward Wilbraham Bootle	Succeeded by Edward Wilbraham Bootle; Sir Robert Lawley
Preceded by John Crewe; Thomas Cholmondeley	Member of Parliament for Cheshire; 1802–1806; With: Thomas Cholmondeley	Succeeded by Thomas Cholmondeley; Davies Davenport
Honorary titles
Preceded by Peter Kyffin Heron	High Sheriff of Cheshire; 1778	Succeeded by John Bower-Jodrell
