= John Spencer Smith =

British diplomat, politician and writer

John Spencer Smith FRS (11 September 1769 – 5 June 1845) was a British diplomat, politician and writer.

Husband of Constance Smith (née Herbert) (Byron's Florence).

== Career ==
Smith joined the British Army in 1790 as an ensign, later promoted to lieutenant. When France declared war on Britain in February 1793 he was in Turkey with his elder brother, Sidney Smith, who obtained a position for him in the British embassy in Constantinople. He was private secretary to the ambassador, Robert Liston, and was chargé d'affaires after Liston left Constantinople in November 1795. He was formally appointed Secretary of Legation in 1798 and continued to serve as chargé d'affaires ad interim.

Smith left Constantinople in 1801 and arrived in England just in time to be invited to stand for Parliament for the borough of Dover in the United Kingdom general election of 1802. While he was a member of parliament he was sent on a mission as Envoy Extraordinary to Württemberg in 1803–04. This mission was interpreted by the French as espionage and used to justify the kidnap of Sir George Rumbold at Hamburg.

Smith withdrew from Dover at the general election of 1806 and soon afterwards settled in Normandy where he wrote on a variety of scholarly subjects. He died at Caen on 5 June 1845.

== Arms ==
Coat of arms of John Spencer Smith
Crest An ounce's head erased Argent, Pelletée, and gorged with a collar Sable, edged Or, charged with three pellets and chained Or. Escutcheon Azure, a chevron engrailed between three lions passant guardant Or. A mullet for difference. Motto Forward

Parliament of the United Kingdom
Preceded by Charles Small Pybus; John Trevanion	Member of Parliament for Dover; 1802–1806; With: John Trevanion	Succeeded by John Jackson; Charles Jenkinson
