= Emma Caroline Smith-Stanley, Countess of Derby =

English wife of Prime Minister (1805-1876)

The Right Honourable The Countess of Derby
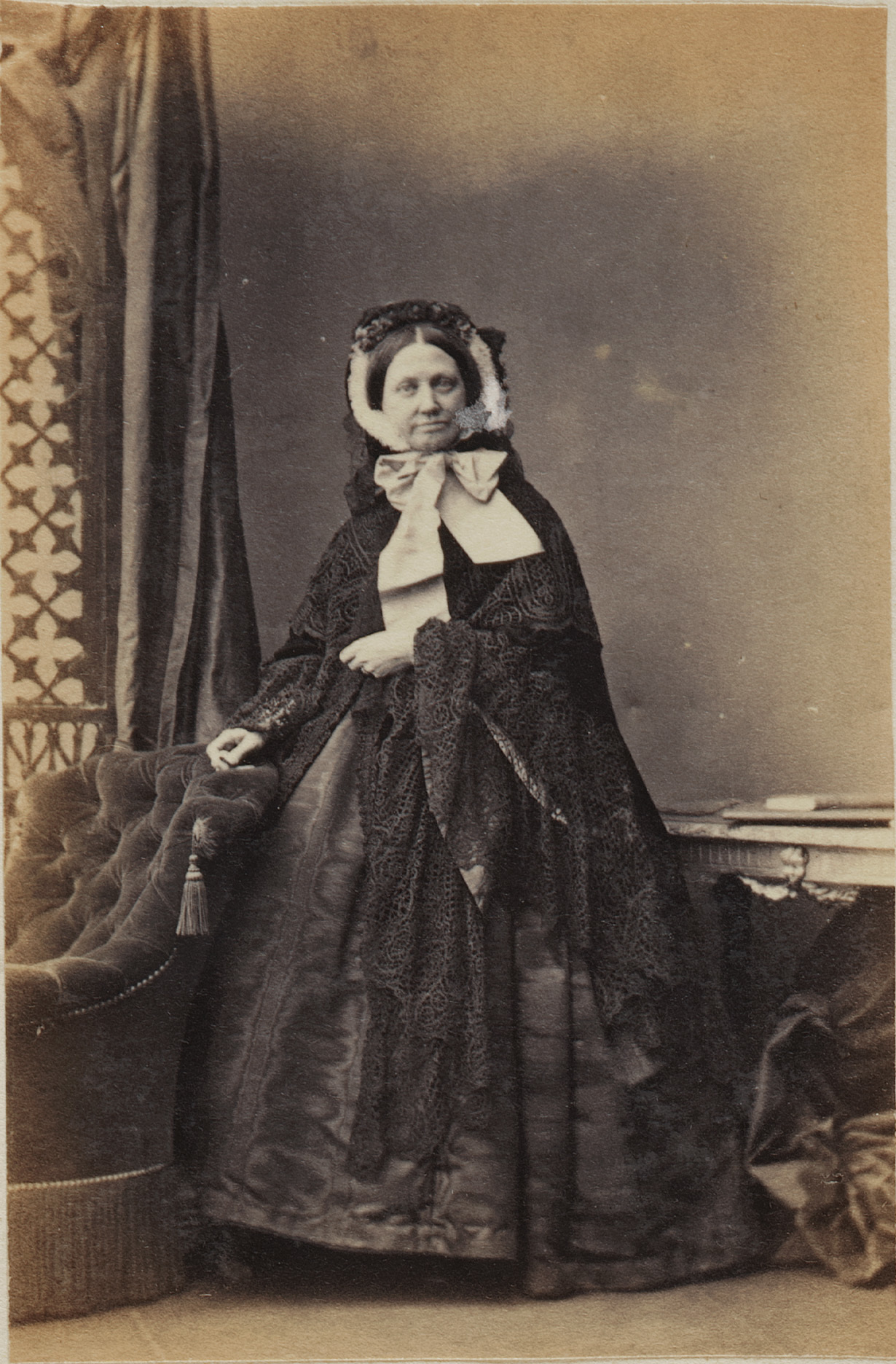
- Lady Derby in 1861
- Born: 1805
- Died: 26 April 1876 (aged 71)
- Known for: Wife of Prime Minister
- Spouse: The 14th Earl of Derby (m. 1825)
- Children: 3, including Edward, 15th Earl of Derby and Frederick, 16th Earl of Derby
- Father: The 1st Baron Skelmersdale
- Relatives: Wellington Chetwynd-Talbot (son-in-law); Richard Bootle-Wilbraham (brother); Richard Wilbraham-Bootle (paternal grandfather)

Emma Caroline Smith-Stanley, Countess of Derby (née Bootle-Wilbraham, 1805 – 26 April 1876), was the wife of Edward Smith-Stanley, the 14th Earl of Derby, who served as Prime Minister of the United Kingdom three times in the mid-19th century.

The second daughter of the 1st Baron Skelmersdale, she married the then Edward Smith-Stanley in May 1825. They had three children:

- Edward Henry Stanley, 15th Earl of Derby, eldest son
- Frederick Arthur Stanley, 16th Earl of Derby, second son, one of Canada's Governors-General and the man after whom the Stanley Cup is named.
- Lady Emma Charlotte Stanley, only daughter (died 23 August 1928), married Wellington Patrick Manvers Chetwynd Talbot, son of Charles Chetwynd-Talbot, 2nd Earl Talbot.

== Arms ==
Coat of arms of Emma Caroline Smith-Stanley, Countess of Derby
| Escutcheon Argent on a bend Azure three bucks’ heads caboshed Or (Edward Smith-Stanley, 14th Earl of Derby) impaling Quarterly 1st & 4th Argent three bendlets wavy Azure 2nd & 3rd Gules on a chevron engrailed between three combs Argent as many crosses patee fitchee of the field (Edward Bootle-Wilbraham, 1st Baron Skelmersdale). Supporters Dexter a griffin wings elevated Or sinister a stag Or each ducally collared with line reflexed over the back Azure. |
