= Constance Smith (née Herbert) =

Constance Smith (Mrs Spencer Smith)
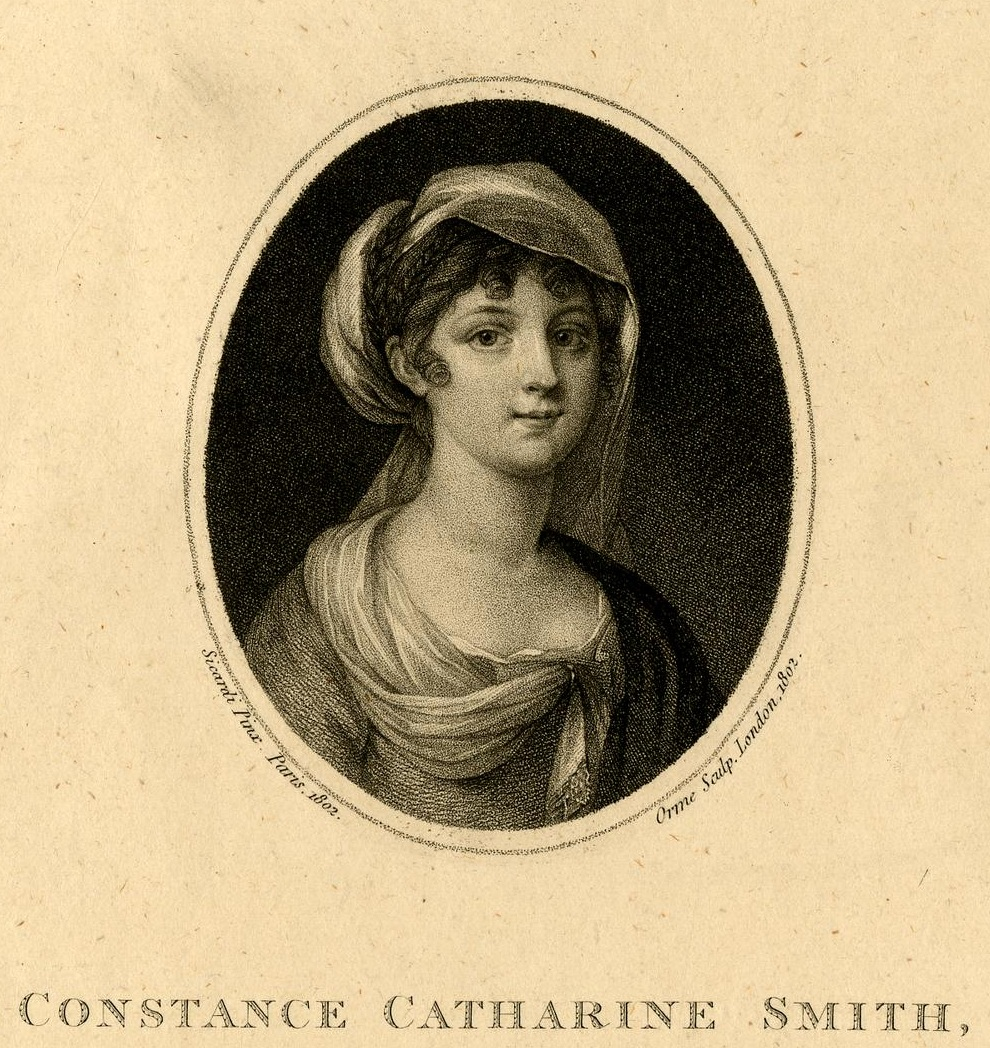
- Born: Constanze Baronne de Herbert Rathkeal; 1785; Istanbul
- Died: 1829 (aged 43–44); Vienna
- Known for: Byron's Florence
- Spouse: John Spencer Smith
- Parents: Baron Peter Philipp von Herbert-Rathkeal (1735–1802) (father); baronne Collenbach (mother)

Constance Catherine Smith, Mrs Spencer Smith (née Constanze Baronne de Herbert Rathkeal; 1785–1829) - wife of a British diplomat John Spencer Smith, known as Florence in several of Byron's poems.

Daughter of baron Herbert, Austrian ambassador to Constantinople. Heroine of Marquis de Salvo's book about her escape from Napoleon and Memoirs of the Duchess D' Abrantés.

== Poems ==
Lord Byron fell in love with her in Malta in 1809.

- To Florence (September 1809)
- Lines written in an album at Malta (September 14, 1809)
- Stanzas composed during a thunderstorm (October 11, 1809)
- Stanzas written in passing the Ambracian gulf (November 14, 1809)
- The spell is broke... (Athens, January 16, 1810)
- Childe Harold's Pilgrimage, II, xxxii-xxxiii.

== Arms ==
Coat of arms of Constance Smith (Smith impaling Herbert)
Escutcheon Azure, a chevron engrailed between three lions passant guardant Or. A mullet for difference. (Smith) impaling : Per pale Azure and Gules, three lions rampant Argent. (Herbert)

== Sources ==
- Marquis de Salvo. Travels in the year 1806 from Italy to England: through the Tyrol, Styria, Bohemia, Gallicia, Poland and Livonia : containing the particulars of the liberation of Mrs. Spencer Smith from the hands of the French police. (Translated from the original mss. in Italian, by W. Fraser) Troy, N.Y. : Wright, Goodenow, & Stockwell, 1808
- Memoirs of the Duchess D' Abrantés (Madame Junot). J. & J. Harper, 1832
- Francis Henry Gribble. The Love Affairs of Lord Byron.
- Grosskurth, Phyllis: Byron: The Flawed Angel. Hodder, 1997. ISBN 0-340-60753-X.

== Links ==
- Letters
- Letters
- Autograph
