= Percy Emmet =

The Ven. Percy Barnabas Emmet (1876 in Berkhamsted – 1963 in Lingfield) was Archdeacon of Nandyal from 1931 until his death on 10 September 1963.

He was educated at St Edward's School, Oxford, Magdalen College, Oxford and Ripon College Cuddesdon; and ordained in 1901. After a curacies in Nottingham, Whaddon and Buckingham he was a Chaplain overseas at Mutyalapad, Jammalamadugu, Kurnool, Kalasapadu, and Giddalur before his years as Archdeacon.
