= Portrait of the Earl of Derby =

Painting by Frederick Richard Say

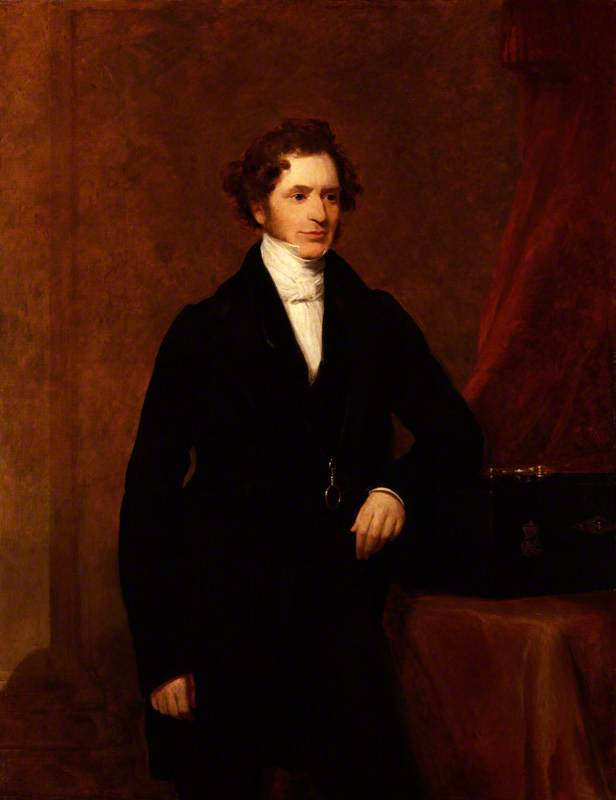
- Artist: Frederick Richard Say
- Year: 1844
- Type: Oil on canvas, portrait
- Dimensions: 142 cm × 110 cm (55.9 in × 44 in)
- Location: National Portrait Gallery, London

Portrait of the Earl of Derby is an 1844 portrait painting by the English artist Frederick Richard Say. It depicts the British politician Edward Smith-Stanley, 14th Earl of Derby who served as Prime Minister on three occasions during the Victorian era.

After entering politics Derby was originally a Whig before switching to Robert Peel's Conservative Party in 1841. At the time of Say's painting he was serving as Secretary of War in Peel's second administration. It was displayed at the Royal Academy Exhibition of 1844. Today it is in the collection of the National Portrait Gallery in London having been donated by the sitter's grandson Edward Stanley, 17th Earl of Derby in 1918.

== Bibliography ==
- Ormond, Richard. Early Victorian Portraits: Text. H.M. Stationery Office, 1974.
- Ramsden, John. An Appetite for Power: A History of the Conservative Party Since 1830. HarperCollins, 1998.
