= Richard Wilbraham-Bootle =

British landowner and politician

Member of Parliament for Chester
- In office 1761–1790 Serving with Thomas Grosvenor
- Preceded by: Sir Richard Grosvenor, Bt; Thomas Grosvenor
- Succeeded by: Viscount Belgrave; Thomas Grosvenor

Personal details
- Born: Richard Wilbraham; 20 September 1725
- Died: 13 March 1796 (aged 70)
- Spouse: Mary Bootle (m. 1755)
- Children: Edward Bootle-Wilbraham, 1st Baron Skelmersdale
- Relatives: Richard Bootle-Wilbraham (grandson); Richard Wilbraham (grandson); Emma Caroline Smith-Stanley (granddaughter)
- Education: St John's College, Oxford

Richard Wilbraham-Bootle (20 September 1725 – 13 March 1796) was a British landowner and politician who sat in the House of Commons for 29 years from 1761 to 1790.

== Early life ==
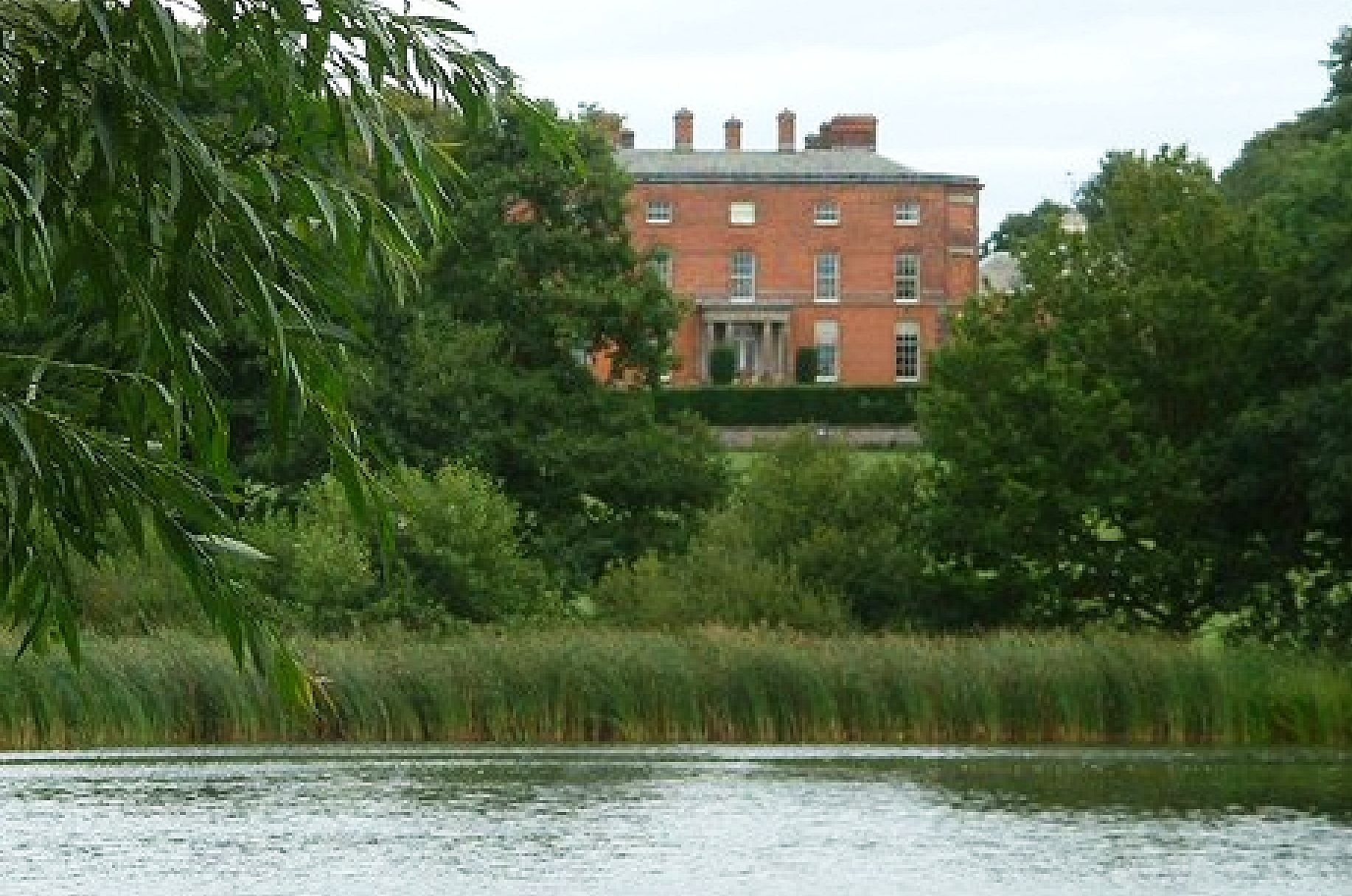
Rode Hall, the seat of the Wilbraham family

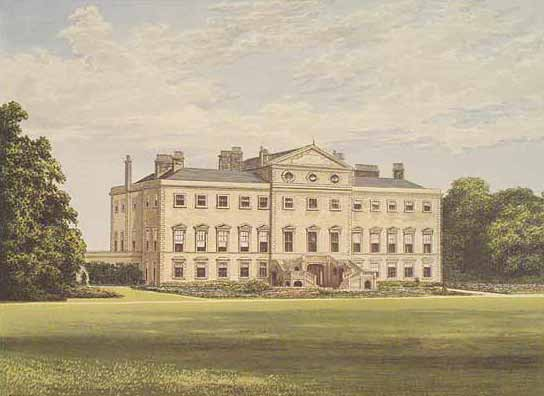
Lathom House, Lancashire

He was born Richard Wilbraham on 20 September 1725, the eldest son of Dorothy (née Kenrick) Wilbraham and Randle Wilbraham of Rode Hall, Cheshire.

He matriculated at St John's College, Oxford on 8 July 1742 and entered Lincoln's Inn in 1742 and was called to the bar in 1747.

== Career ==
Wilbraham Bootle was returned as Member of Parliament for Chester without a contest in the 1761 general election and was returned unopposed again in 1768, 1774 and 1780. In 1780 the English Chronicle described him as “one of the most independent Members in the House”. He was a member of the St. Alban's Tavern group which in February 1784 tried to bring Pitt and Fox together. In the 1784 general election, he was returned with a comfortable majority the first time he had to contest his seat at Chester. He retired in 1790. Only a few speeches by him are recorded and none were of any consequence.

In 1758, he inherited Lathom House on the death of his wife's father and in 1770 inherited Rode Hall on the death of his own father.

== Personal life ==
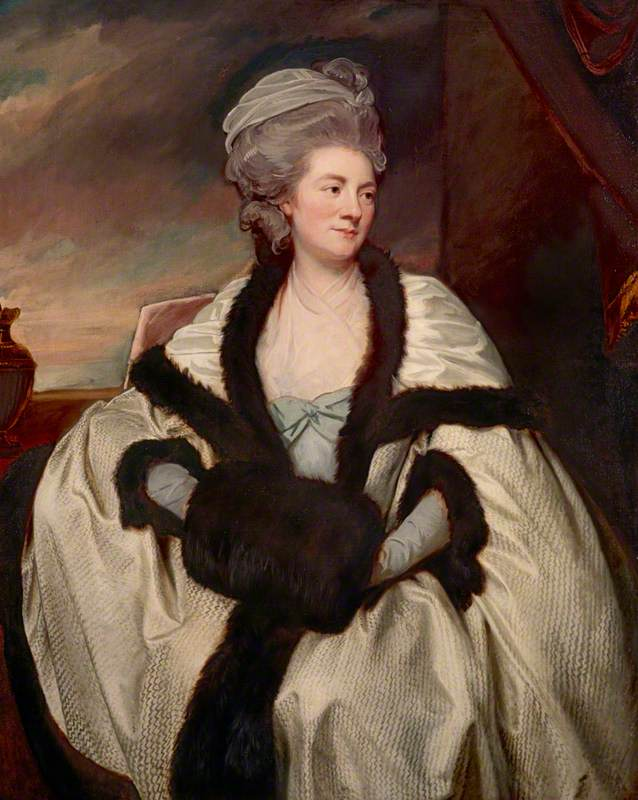
Portrait of his wife, the former Mary Bootle, by George Romney

On 31 May 1755, he married Mary Bootle, daughter and heiress of Robert Bootle of Lathom House, Lancashire. Upon his marriage, he took the additional name of Bootle. Together, they were the parents of at least six sons and eight daughters, including:

- Anne Dorothea Wilbraham-Bootle (1757–1825), who married Richard Arden, 1st Baron Alvanley.
- Mary Wilbraham-Bootle (1760–1784), who married William Egerton in 1780.
- Francisca Alicia Wilbraham-Bootle (1762–1810), who married Anthony Hardolph Eyre of Grove Hall in 1783; their daughter Mary Letitia Eyre married Charles Pierrepont, 2nd Earl Manvers.
- Emma Wilbraham-Bootle (1765–1797), who married Sir Charles Edmonstone, 2nd Baronet, of Duntreath, in 1794.
- Elizabeth Wilbraham-Bootle (1766–1841), who married the Rev. W. Barnes, Rector at Brixton Doverill, in 1821.
- Sibylla Georgiana Wilbraham-Bootle (d. 1799), who married William Ffarington in 1791.
- Edward Bootle-Wilbraham, 1st Baron Skelmersdale (1771–1853), who married Mary Elizabeth Taylor, daughter of Rev. Edward Taylor, in 1796.
- Randle Bootle-Wilbraham (1773–1861), who married Letitia Rudd, daughter of Rev. Edward Rudd, in 1798. After her death in 1805, he married Sibylla Egerton, daughter of Philip Egerton, in 1808.

Wilbraham Bootle died on 13 March 1796. His eldest son Edward inherited Lathom House and was created Baron Skelmersdale. Rode Hall passed to his younger son, Randle Wilbraham, father of General Sir Richard Wilbraham.

Parliament of Great Britain
Preceded by Sir Richard Grosvenor, Bt; Thomas Grosvenor	Member of Parliament for Chester; 1761–1790; With: Thomas Grosvenor	Succeeded by Viscount Belgrave; Thomas Grosvenor
