= Frederick Richard Say =

English painter (1804–1868)

Frederick Richard Say (30 November 1804 – 30 March 1868) was a society portrait painter in London between c. 1830 and c.1860, undertaking commissions for portraits of figures such as Earl Grey, Sir Robert Peel, the Duke of Wellington and the Royal family.

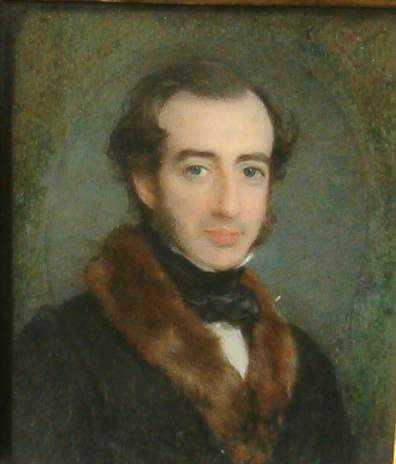
F.R. Say, by W.C. Ross

== Family ==
The Say family was notable in the early Middle Ages (Geoffrey de Say was one of the barons who made King John sign Magna Carta). In Burke’s Landed Gentry of 1862/63, there is an entry for “Say of Tilney”, describing the medieval ramifications and mentioning that “a branch of the family finally settled at Tilney Islington”, followed by an extended genealogy from the sixteenth century down to Frederick Richard Say.

Frederick’s parents were William Say, a London engraver, and Eleanor Francis, who married on 30 December 1790 at St Mary Marylebone in London. William died on 24 August 1834 in London, aged 66.

Frederick was born on 30 November 1804 and baptized at St Mary Marylebone on 1 February 1805. An elder brother born in October 1802 probably died in infancy. There were also three elder sisters, all of whom married known figures in the contemporary art world. Mary Anne (born 24 August 1794) married in 1817 (as his second wife) the architect John Buonarotti Papworth (1775 – 1847), Leonora (born 4 February 1798) married in 1827 another architect, William Adams Nicholson (1803 – 1853), and Emma (born 4 May 1800) married also in 1827 George Morant (1770 – 1846), who ran a Bond Street business in furniture and picture-framing.

In the mid-1840s, Frederick visited the Thompson family of Kirby Hall, at Little Ouseburn in Yorkshire, to paint portraits of several of the family. Among the daughters whose portrait he painted was Henrietta (1807 – 1872), to whom he may also have given instruction in painting, and he announced his forthcoming marriage to her in late 1847; the wedding took place on 6 April 1848. They moved into a new high-class development at Slough, Upton Park.

After he died on 29 March 1868 at Upton Park, he was buried at St Mary’s Church in Upton, Slough. His wife Henrietta died on 3 May 1872 and was buried at Upton with her husband. Their tombs have not been preserved. They had two children, Evelyn Geoffrey (born 18 February 1851) and Henrietta Maude (born 25 March 1854).

== Work ==
The first record of Frederick’s work is an award (a “Silver Palette”) he received in 1817 at the Royal Society of Arts for a drawing and he received other awards at the same society in 1819 and 1820. Already in 1819, he was producing some quite accomplished engravings, presumably under his father’s guidance.

Say attended the school that the painter Benjamin Robert Haydon ran from 1815 in direct competition with the classes at the Royal Academy. Haydon’s memoirs record that Say always meant to paint portraits. His teaching method was heavily directed towards correct anatomical representation, and his students spent much time drawing from bodies at Sir Charles Bell’s surgery. It may be this anatomical experience that led to a major undertaking by Frederick and his father, to draw and engrave a series of detailed pictures of specimens of diseased human organs for Dr Richard Bright (1789–1858) in the latter 1820s. Frederick also painted a portrait of Bright in 1825, and another in the late 1830s.

Frederick began to exhibit in the Royal Academy’s Summer Exhibition and the British Institution in 1826, and he continued to exhibit at the Royal Academy every year except 1834 until 1854 (a total of 78 paintings), although he never became a Royal Academician.

A series of drawings of writers (Robert Plumer Ward, Thomas Haynes Bayly, Thomas Colley Grattan, Mary Russell Mitford, Constantine Henry Phipps, Edward Bulwer Lytton) was published as engravings in the New Monthly Magazine in 1831. He exhibited 1830 portraits of Frances Parker, Countess of Morley, of Saltram House and of Lady Elizabeth Bulteel, one of the daughters of Charles Grey, 2nd Earl Grey (and also painted portraits of the spouses of both, at an unknown date). John Parker, 1st Earl of Morley, and his family were good friends of the Greys, who often went to Devon in the summer for Lady Grey’s health. Maybe as a result, Say was soon after commissioned to paint a full-length portrait of Earl Grey, then prime minister, and several of his daughters (Mary Wood, Viscountess Halifax and Lady Louisa Lambton) and daughters-in-law (Maria Countess Grey and Maria Viscountess Howick). Another early notable commission was a portrait of Sir William Pitt Amherst, 1st Earl Amherst (another friend of John Parker), for Christ Church, Oxford, completed in 1830.

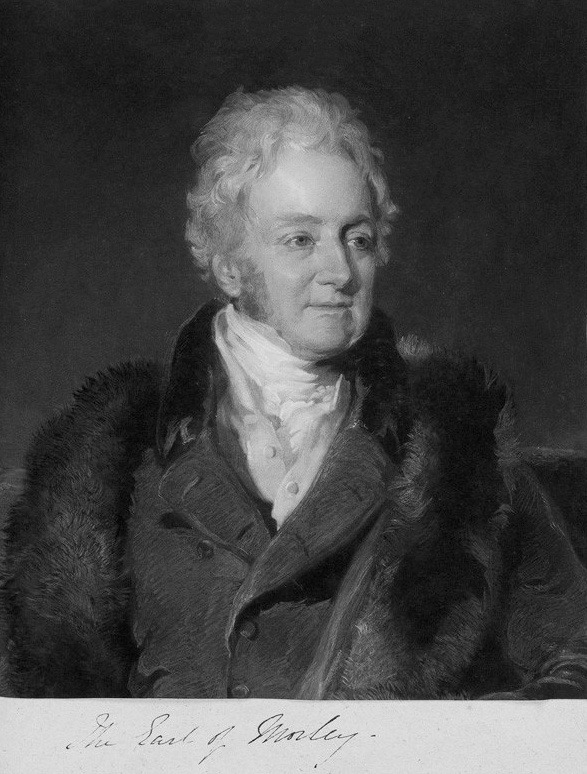
John Parker, 1st Earl of Morley (1772–1840), engraving by William Say, published by Colnaghi, after Frederick Richard Say

Another work from c.1830 was “Little Wanderers”, a romantic portrayal of the sisters Alice and Edith Acraman, daughters of Daniel Wade Acraman (1775–1847), a rich iron manufacturer of Clifton, Bristol. Say had more extensive relations with the Acraman family, painting a portrait of the girls’ mother, sketching the heads of these children many times as models for angels’ heads depicted in some mural decorations and giving Edith painting lessons, and introducing her to a wide circle of artistic friends.

In the early 1840s, Say was commissioned by Sir Robert Peel to paint several portraits for the “Statesmen’s Gallery” that he was constituting at his home, Drayton Manor in Staffordshire. These portraits included those of Henry Pelham Fiennes Pelham-Clinton, 5th Duke of Newcastle-under-Lyme, Edward Stanley, Lord Stanley (later 14th Earl of Derby and several times Prime Minister), Edward Law, 1st Earl of Ellenborough (Governor-General of India, 1842–44), (these three being on display at the London National Portrait Gallery), Sir Frederick Pollock (Privy Councillor and Lord Chief Baron), Walter Francis Scott, 5th Duke of Buccleuch, Lord Privy Seal, and a second portrait of Sir William Webb Follett. Peel demanded that the portraits he commissioned be kept simple. He also possessed one copy of the portrait of Earl Grey by Say (see above).

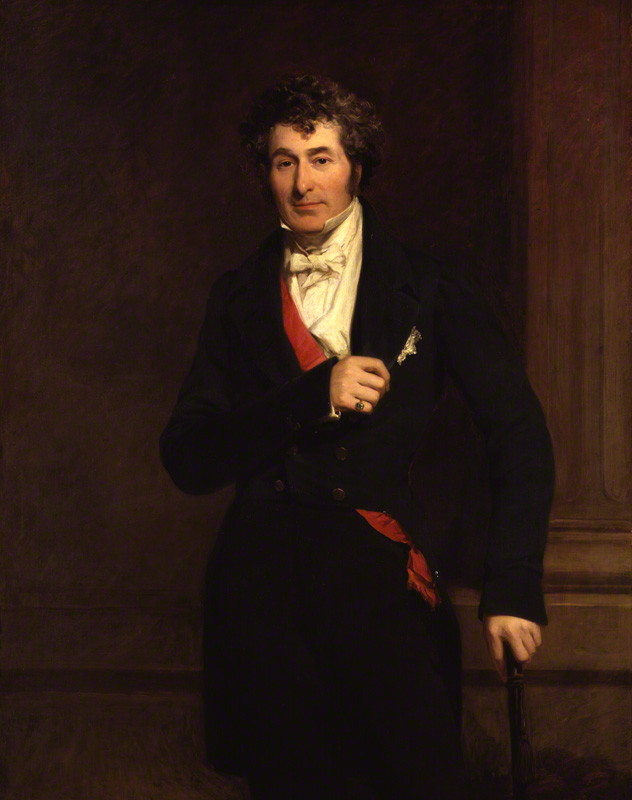
Edward Law, 1st Earl of Ellenborough (1790-1871), by F.R. Say

A group of Calcutta residents commissioned the portrait of Dwarkananth Tagore, a merchant, philanthropist and reformer, to be hung in the Town Hall, Calcutta, when Tagore visited England (in extravagant style) in 1841. The painting was exhibited at the Royal Academy in 1843, when The Art Union reported that “it is beyond all question the most remarkable work in the exhibition”.

Say gained support and commissions from the Royal household. In the second half of the 1840s, he was commissioned to paint portraits of some of Queen Victoria and Prince Albert's close German relatives, Ernst, Duke of Saxe-Coburg & Gotha, and Wilhelm I, Prince of Prussia and later a double portrait of Ernest, Prince of Leiningen and Prince Victor of Hohenlohe-Langenburg. It may have been for this purpose that he made a journey to Prussia in August to October 1846. In 1849, he was commissioned to paint a large full-length portrait of Prince Albert, for presentation to the University of Cambridge when Albert was appointed Chancellor of the University. Numerous other portraits, as well as copies of paintings by Franz Xaver Winterhalter, were also executed for the Queen in the 1850s. One of Say’s last major works was a life-size portrait of the Queen’s second son, Prince Alfred in 1861 for the South African Library in Cape Town, “painted … in commemoration of His Royal Highness’s Visit to the Colony in the Year 1860” to inaugurate new harbour works in Table Bay.

At least 50 of Say’s portraits were copied as engravings for wider diffusion, by engravers such as Samuel Cousins and George Raphael Ward. Some of his portraits are now known only from existing engravings.

Two portraits of Frederick Say have survived, both miniatures. One shows him as a fresh-faced, golden-haired boy of 12 years, painted by a Miss Green, perhaps a daughter of James Green, who painted the portrait of Frederick’s father William that is in the National Portrait Gallery. The second portrait, of an adult, dark-haired Frederick, by the famous miniaturist Sir William Ross, is undated, and shows him looking distinguished and prosperous.

By the time Say stopped painting in about 1862, his classical style of portraiture was going out of fashion, and photography was making inroads into the market for pictures of people.

== Gallery ==
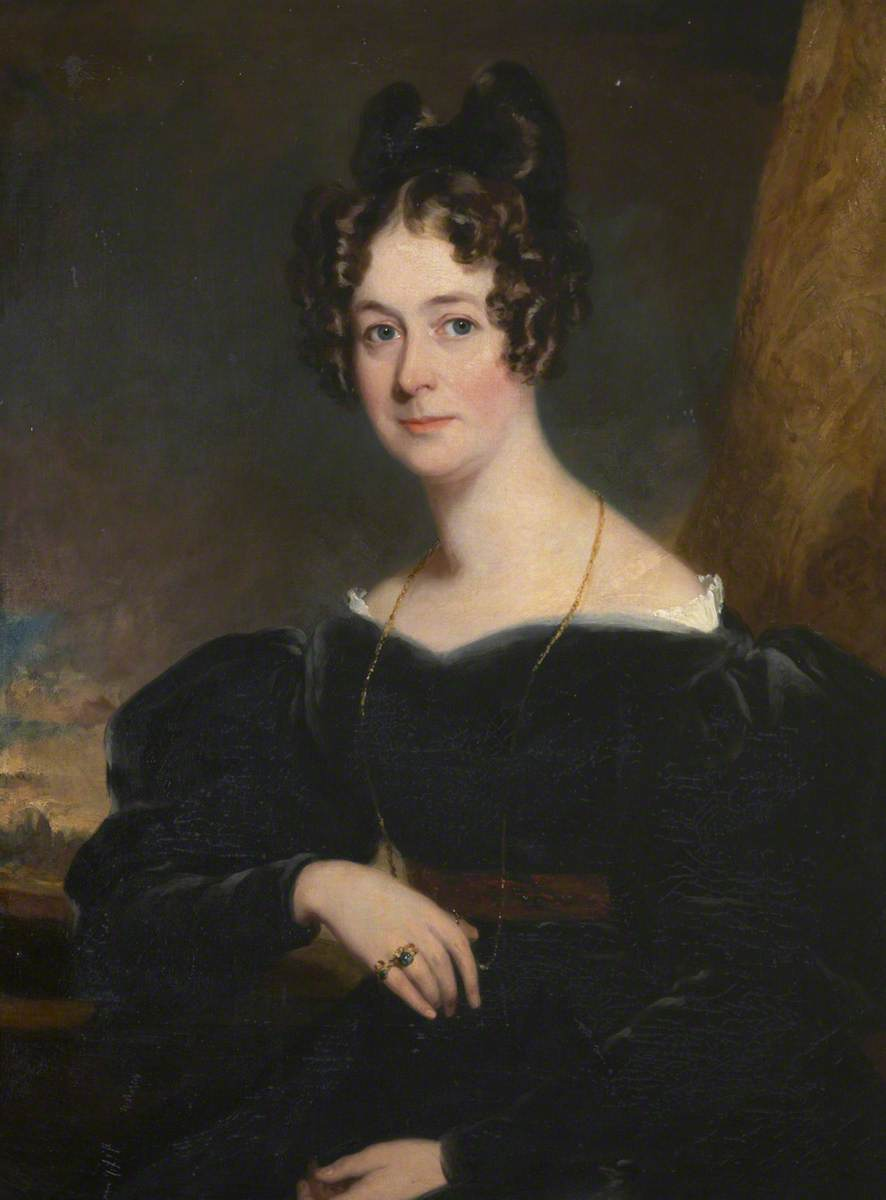
Countess of Morley, 1830

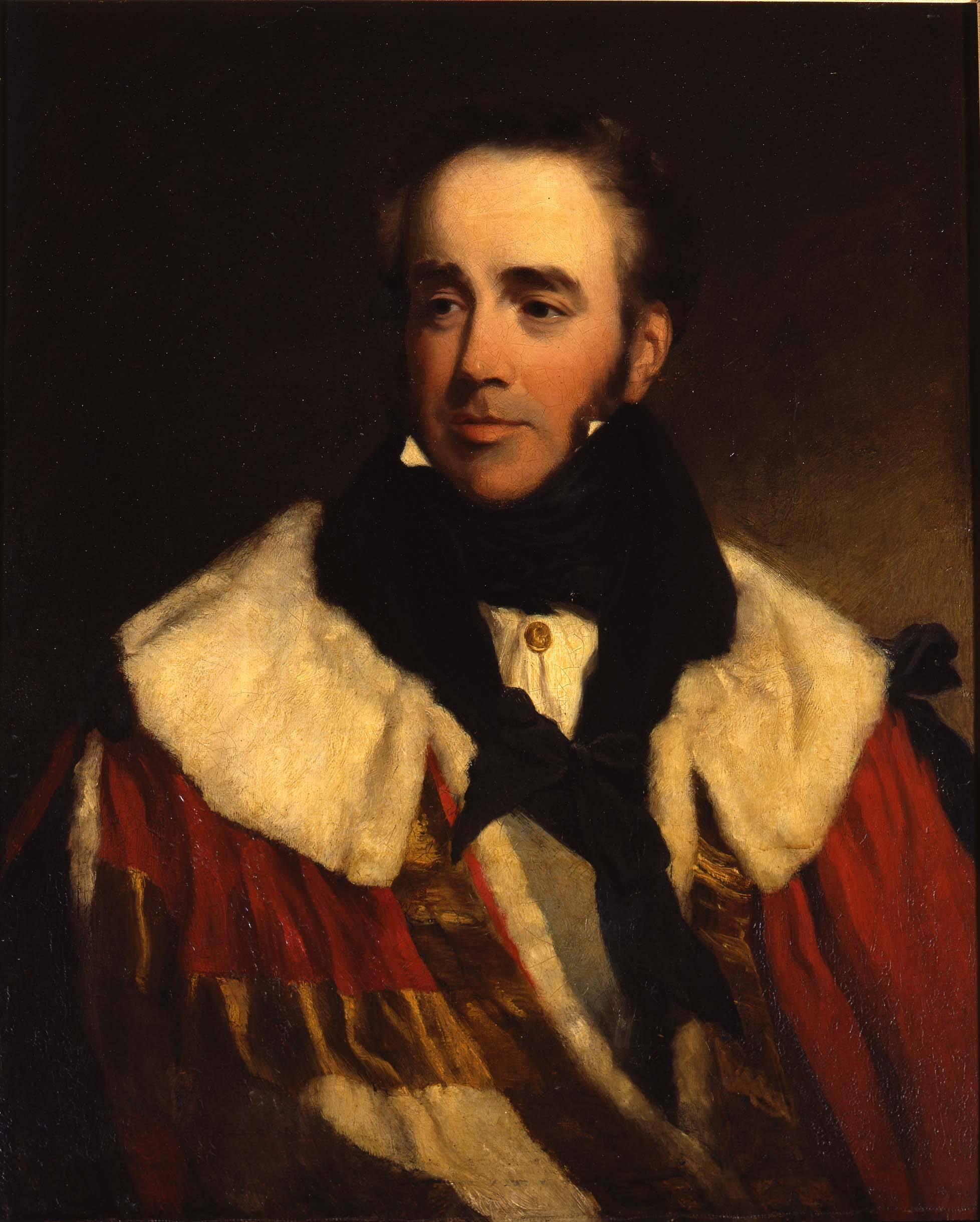
Earl of Roden, 1830

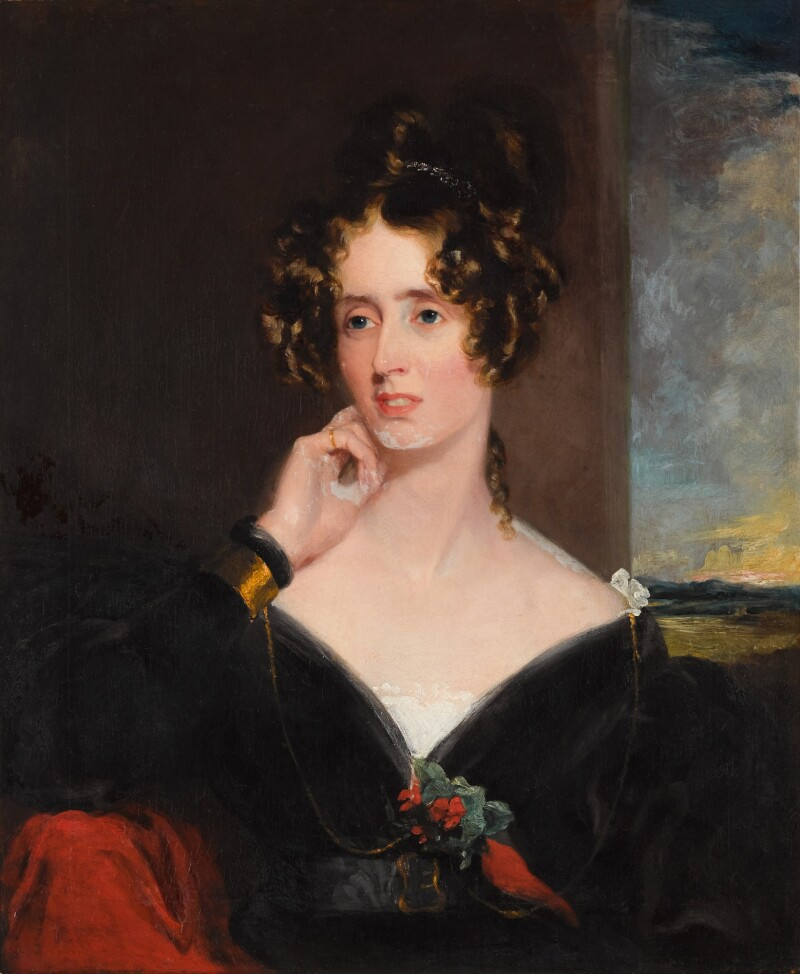
Lady Elizabeth Bulteel, 1831

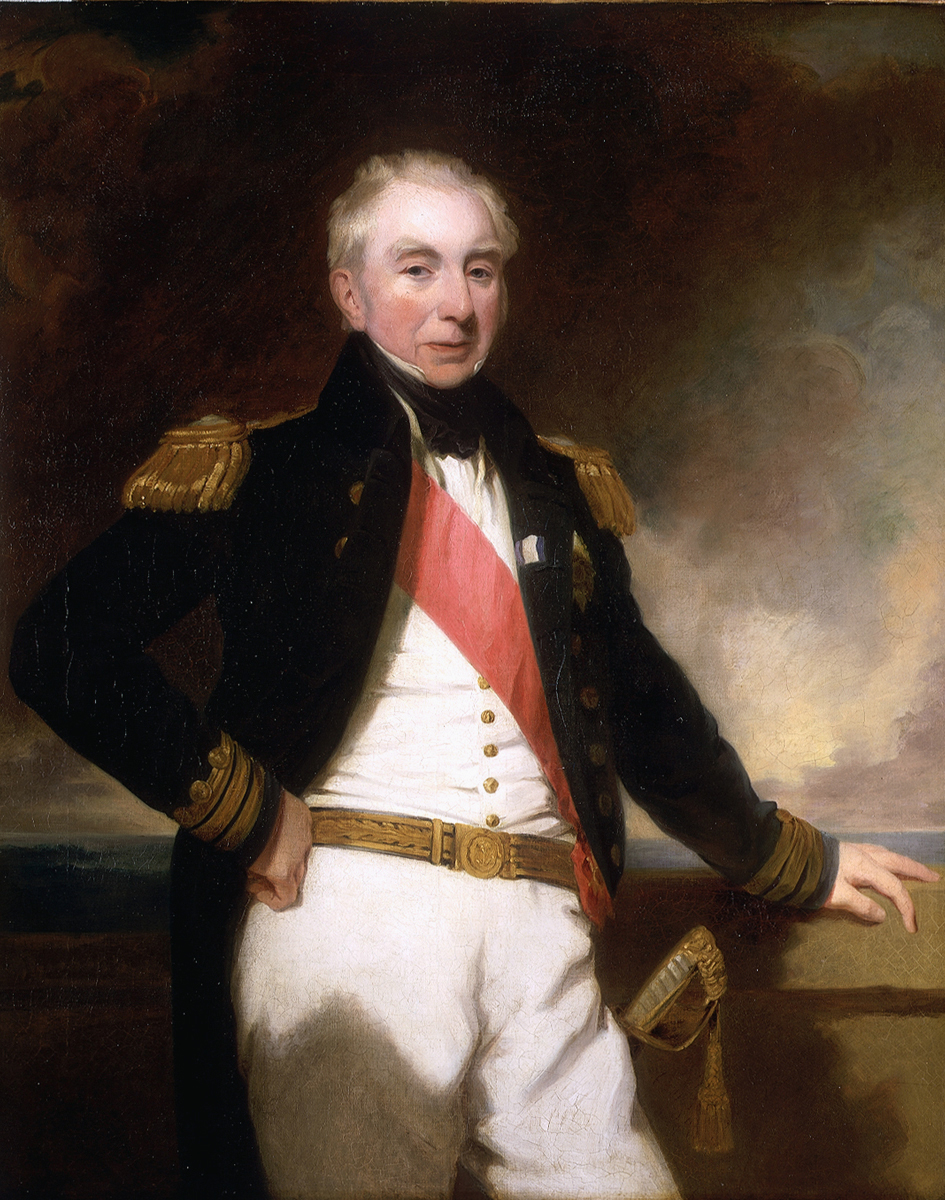
Robert Stopford, 1840

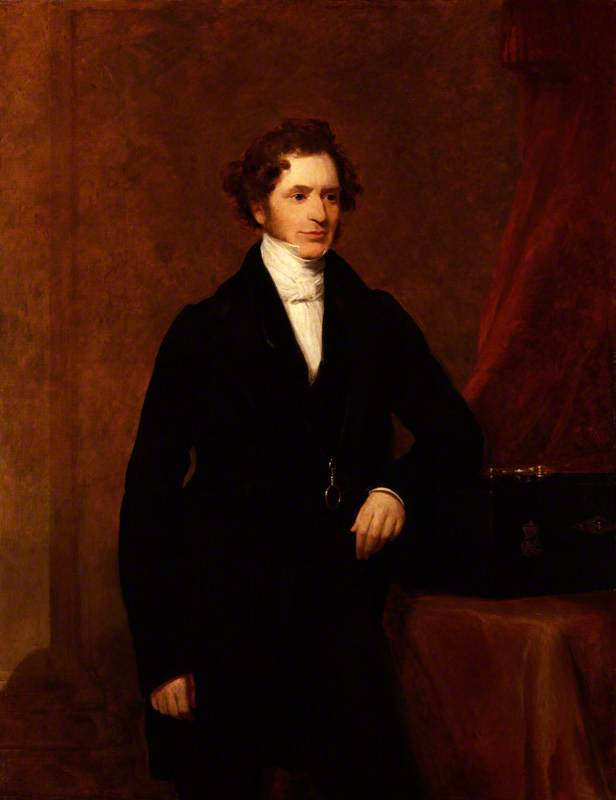
Portrait of the Earl of Derby, 1844

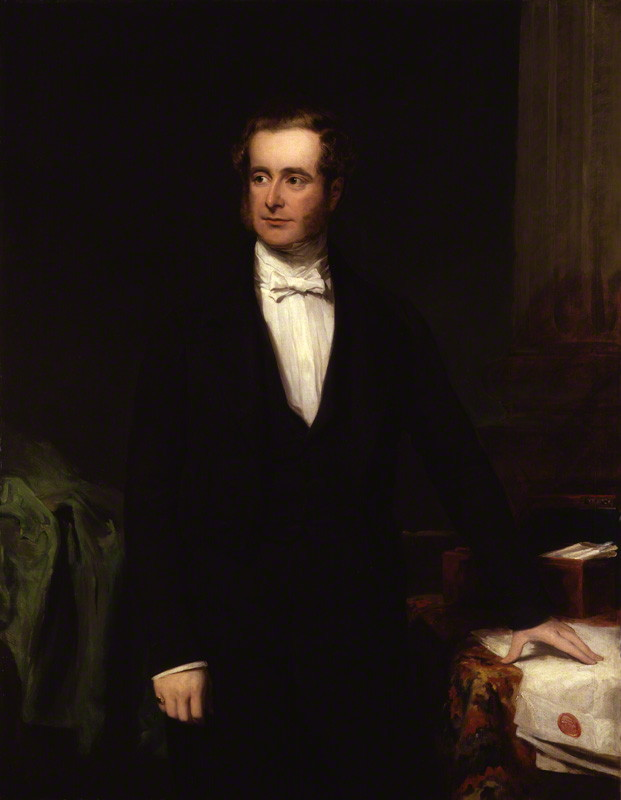
Duke of Newcastle, 1848

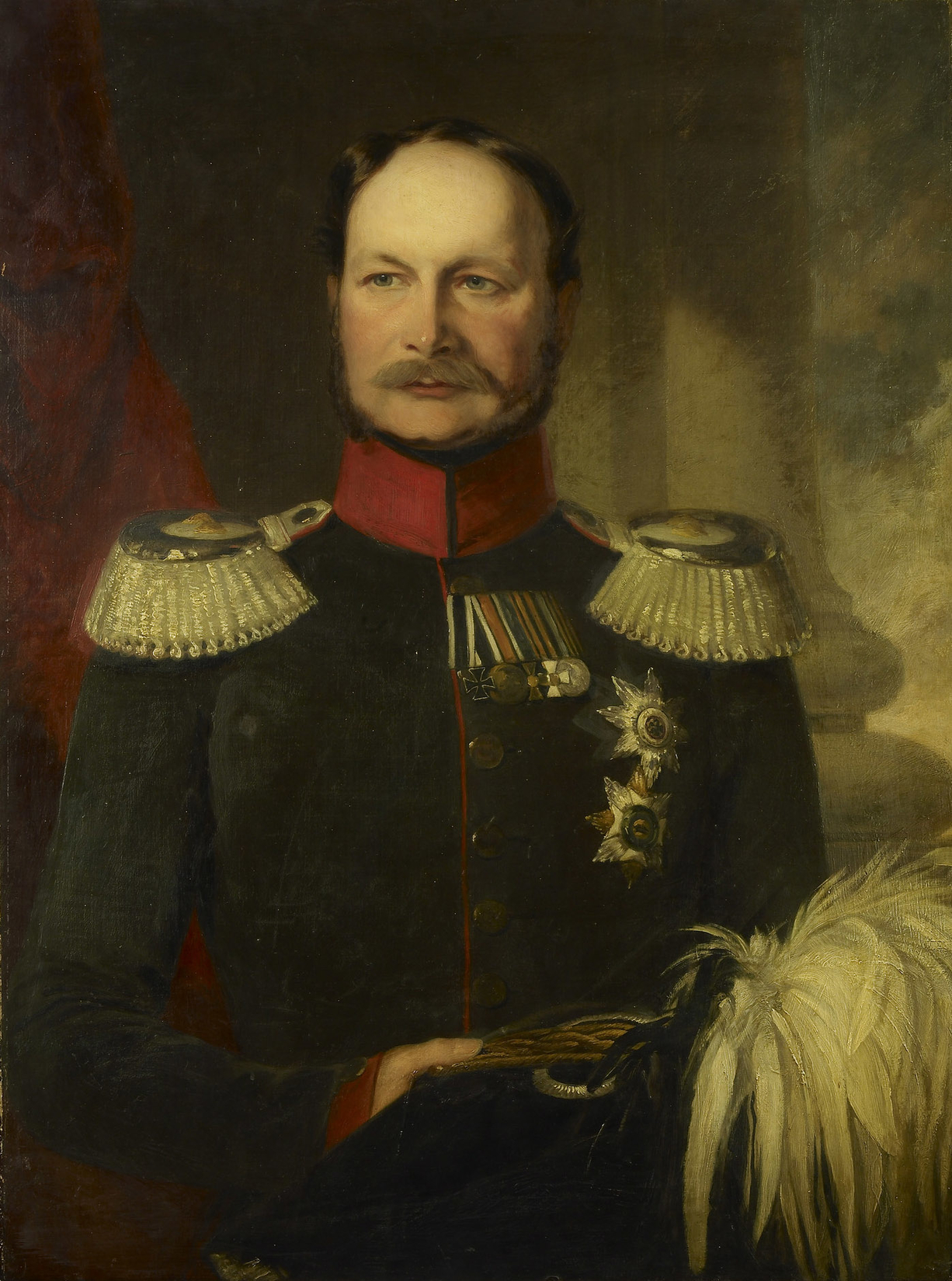
William I of Prussia, 1848

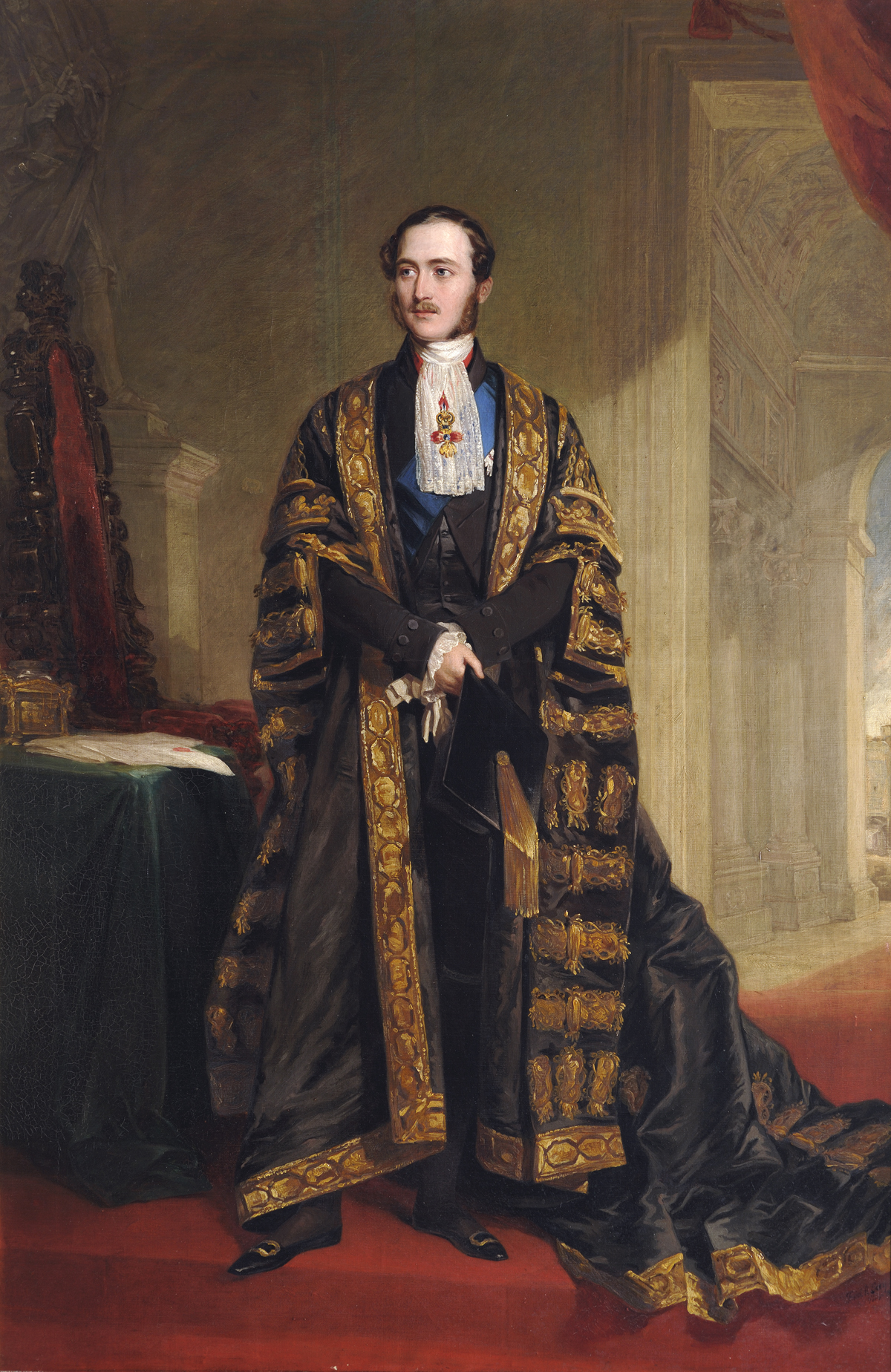
Prince Albert, 1849

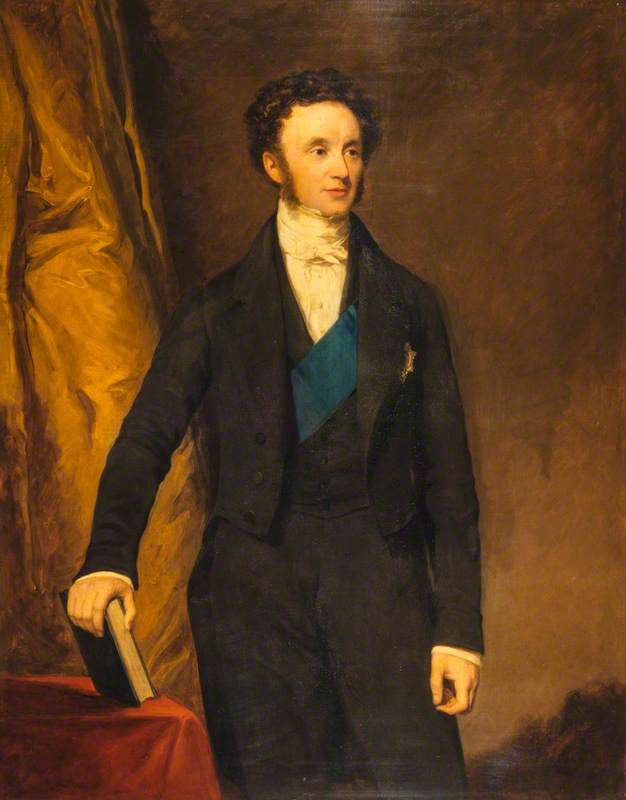
Duke of Buccleuch, 1850

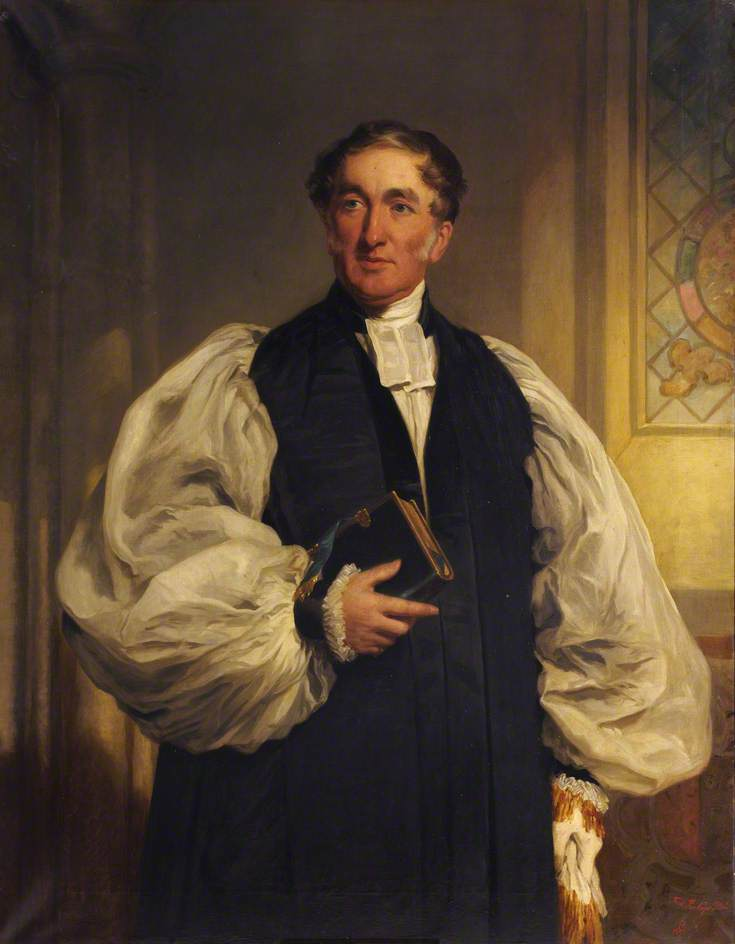
Thomas Musgrave, 1863
