= Robert Bootle =

English ship's captain in the service of the East India Company

Robert Bootle FRS (c. 1694 – 7 May 1758) was an English ship's captain in the service of the East India Company who was elected four times to serve as a director of the company.

== Early life ==
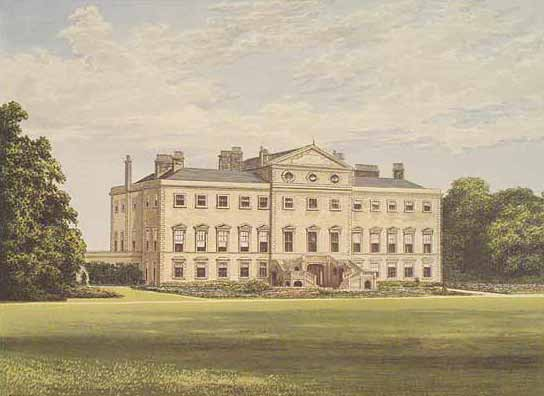
Lathom House, built for his brother, Sir Thomas Bootle, 1740

He was born at Lathom House in Lancashire, a younger son of Robert Bootle of Maghull. His elder brother was Sir Thomas Bootle, MP for Liverpool.

== Career ==
He was the commander of the London Indiaman on five voyages to the East between 1723 and 1739. Apart from the London he had a financial interest in the Suffolk. He was a director of the East India Company in 1741–44, 1746–49, 1752–53, and 1755.

He was elected a fellow of the Royal Society in 1757. His application citation described him as " a gentleman well versed in Mathematical learning, & several other branches of polite literature".

== Personal life ==
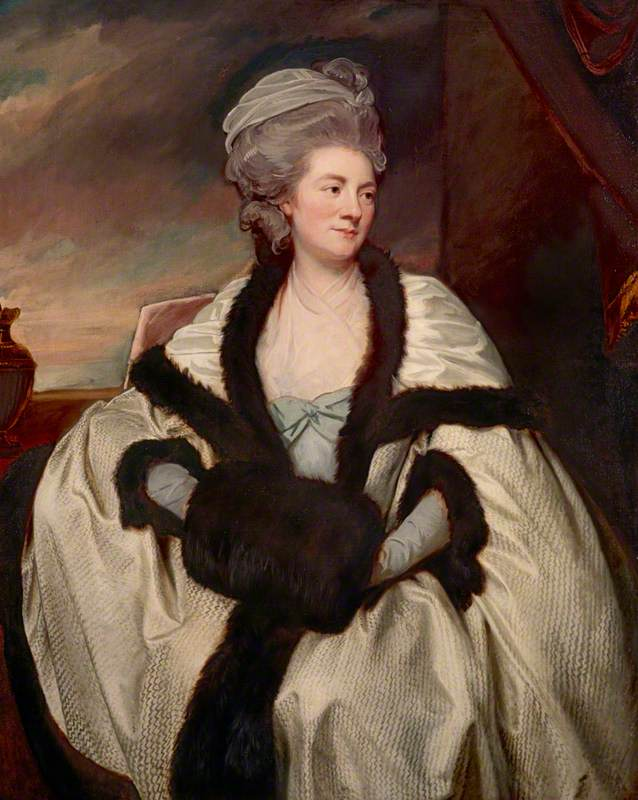
Portrait of his daughter, Mary Wilbraham-Bootle, by George Romney

In 1732, Bootle married Anne Tooke, a daughter of Edmund Tooke of London. She was a favorite cousin of John Loveday of Caversham. Together, they were the parents of one daughter:

- Mary Bootle (1734–1813), who married Richard Wilbraham, MP for Chester (upon their marriage, he assumed the surname Wilbraham-Bootle.

He lived in Hatton Garden, London before inheriting Lathom House in 1753 on the death of his unmarried elder brother, Thomas. On his own death in 1758 it passed to his daughter and sole heir, Mary.

=== Descendants ===
Through his daughter, he was a grandfather of at least six grandsons and eight granddaughters, including Edward Bootle-Wilbraham, 1st Baron Skelmersdale who inherited Lathom House.

== See also ==
- List of East India Company directors
