= Edward Bootle-Wilbraham, 1st Baron Skelmersdale =

British politician (1771–1853)

The Lord Skelmersdale
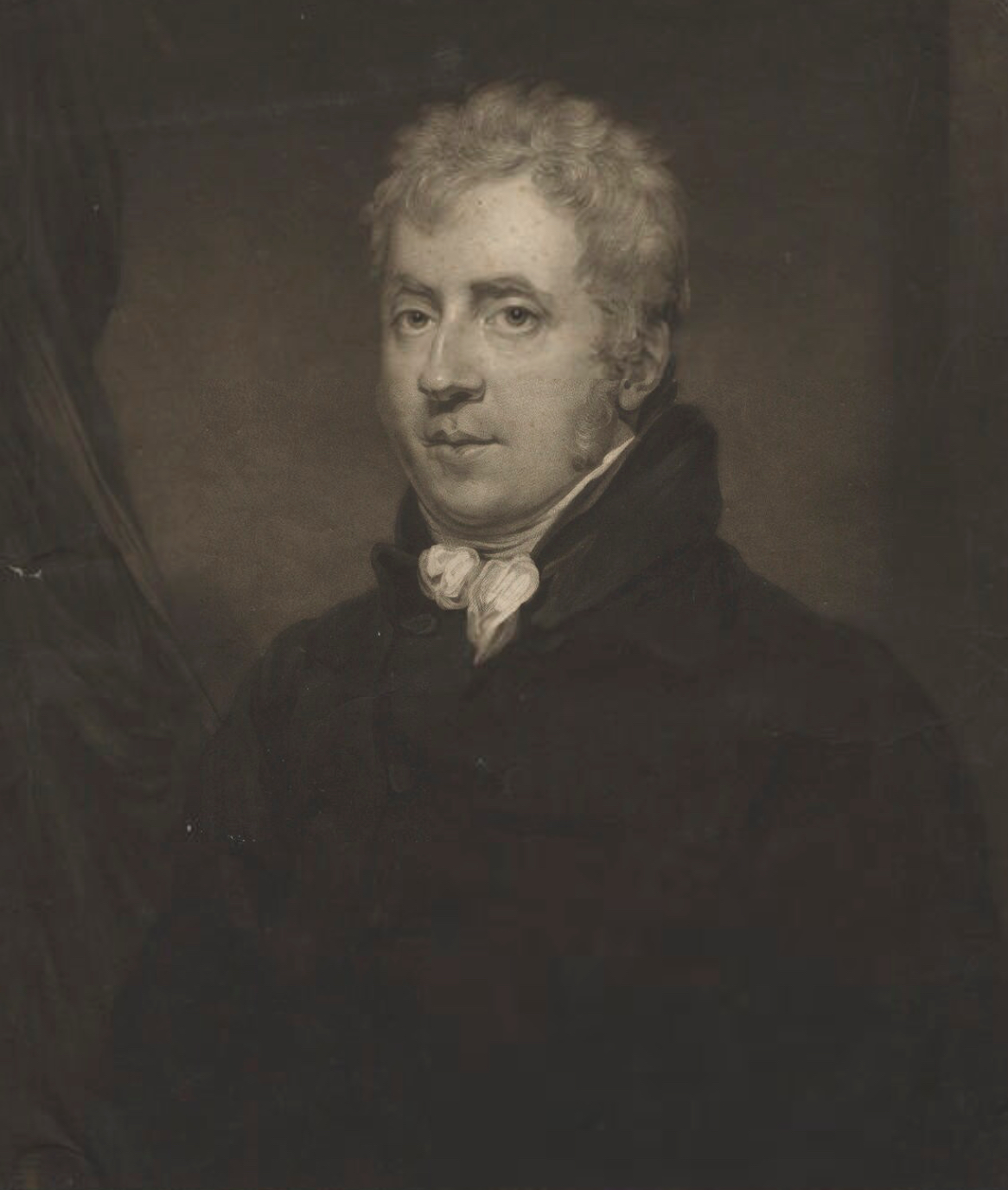
- Portrait, published 1834

Member of Parliament for Westbury
- In office 1795–1796 Serving with Samuel Estwick II
- Preceded by: Samuel Estwick I Samuel Estwick II
- Succeeded by: Sir Henry St John-Mildmay, Bt; George Ellis

Member of Parliament for Newcastle-under-Lyme
- In office 1796–1801 Serving with William Egerton
- Preceded by: William Egerton; Sir Francis Ford, Bt
- Succeeded by: Parliament of the United Kingdom

Member of Parliament for Newcastle-under-Lyme
- In office 1801–1812 Serving with William Egerton (1801–02); Sir Robert Lawley (1802–06); James Macdonald (1806–12)
- Preceded by: Parliament of Great Britain
- Succeeded by: Earl Gower; Sir John Fenton Boughey, Bt

Member of Parliament for Clitheroe
- In office 1812–1818 Serving with Robert Curzon; Viscount Castlereagh
- Preceded by: Robert Curzon
- Succeeded by: Robert Curzon; William Cust

Member of Parliament for Dover
- In office 1820–1828 Serving with Sir John Jackson, Bt (1818–20); Joseph Butterworth (1820–26); Charles Poulett Thomson (1826–28)
- Preceded by: Sir John Jackson, Bt; Charles Jenkinson
- Succeeded by: Charles Poulett Thomson; William Henry Trant

Personal details
- Born: 7 March 1771
- Died: 3 April 1853 (aged 82)
- Party: Tory
- Spouse: Mary Elizabeth Taylor (m. 1796; died 1840)
- Children: Richard Bootle-Wilbraham (son); Emma Bootle-Wilbraham (daughter)
- Parents: Richard Wilbraham-Bootle (father); Mary Bootle (mother)
- Relatives: Robert Bootle (maternal grandfather); Edward Bootle-Wilbraham (grandson)

Edward Bootle-Wilbraham, 1st Baron Skelmersdale (7 March 1771 – 3 April 1853), was a British landowner and politician who served as a Member of Parliament.

== Life ==
Bootle-Wilbraham was the son of Richard Wilbraham-Bootle and his wife Mary, daughter of Robert Bootle. He inherited Lathom House on the death of his father in 1796 and changed his name by royal licence in 1814 to Bootle-Wilbraham.

He was elected to the House of Commons for Westbury in 1795, a seat he held until 1796, and then represented Newcastle-under-Lyme from 1796 to 1812, Clitheroe from 1812 to 1818 and Dover from 1818 to 1828. On 30 January 1828 he was raised to the peerage as Baron Skelmersdale, of Skelmersdale in the County Palatine of Lancaster.

Lord Skelmersdale married Mary Elizabeth, daughter of Reverend Edward Taylor, in 1796. She died in 1840. Skelmersdale survived her by thirteen years and died in April 1853, aged 82. They had a number of children, including: Richard Bootle-Wilbraham (1801–1844), Edward Bootle-Wilbraham (1807–1882), and Emma Caroline Smith-Stanley, Countess of Derby and the Hon. Mary Charlotte (1800–?).

He was succeeded in the barony by his grandson Edward, his eldest son the Hon. Richard Bootle-Wilbraham having predeceased him.

== Notes ==
Parliament of Great Britain
Preceded by Samuel Estwick I Samuel Estwick II	Member of Parliament for Westbury; 1795–1796; With: Samuel Estwick II	Succeeded by Sir Henry St John-Mildmay, Bt; George Ellis
Preceded by William Egerton; Sir Francis Ford, Bt	Member of Parliament for Newcastle-under-Lyme; 1796–1801; With: William Egerton	Succeeded by Parliament of the United Kingdom
Parliament of the United Kingdom
Preceded by Parliament of Great Britain	Member of Parliament for Newcastle-under-Lyme; 1801–1812; With: William Egerton 1801–1802; Sir Robert Lawley 1802–1806; James Macdonald 1806–1812	Succeeded by Earl Gower; Sir John Fenton Boughey, Bt
Preceded by Robert Curzon	Member of Parliament for Clitheroe; 1812–1818; With: Robert Curzon; Viscount Castlereagh	Succeeded by Robert Curzon; William Cust
Preceded by Sir John Jackson, Bt; Charles Jenkinson	Member of Parliament for Dover; 1820–1828; With: Sir John Jackson, Bt 1818–1820; Joseph Butterworth 1820–1826; Charles Poulett Thomson 1826–1828	Succeeded by Charles Poulett Thomson; William Henry Trant
Peerage of the United Kingdom
New creation	Baron Skelmersdale; 1828–1853	Succeeded by Edward Bootle-Wilbraham
