= North Lancashire (constituency) =

Parliamentary constituency in the United Kingdom, 1832–1885

- Former county constituency for the House of Commons
- Context: 1832-1868. Extract from 1837 result: the central 'doubly' blue area crossing Morecambe Bay

1832–1885
- Seats: two
- Created from: Lancashire
- Replaced by: Barrow-in-Furness, Blackpool, Chorley, Lancaster, and North Lonsdale

North Lancashire was a county constituency of the House of Commons of the Parliament of the United Kingdom. It was represented by two Members of Parliament. The constituency was created by the Great Reform Act 1832 by the splitting of Lancashire constituency into Northern and Southern divisions.

== Great Reform Act 1832 ==
The Representation of the People Act 1832 reformed the distribution of seats in England and Wales. It introduced the principle of splitting the shire counties into divisions and returning two Members for each division rather than for the whole county and it also reformed the parliamentary boroughs that were entitled to send Members to Parliament. Schedule A listed boroughs that were to be abolished and it included Newton. Schedule B listed boroughs to return a single Member to subsequent parliaments and Clitheroe was listed.

Schedules C and D of the act listed the newly created parliamentary boroughs. Those in schedule C were to return two members and these included Manchester, Bolton, Blackburn and Oldham in Lancashire. Those in schedule D were to become single seat boroughs and included Ashton-under-Lyne, Bury, Rochdale, Salford, and Warrington.

Schedule F of the act listed the counties to be divided into two divisions, both of which would return two Members. Lancashire was one of those listed. The Boundary Commission proposals that followed the act, published in 1832, made recommendations on the boundaries of the parliamentary boroughs and divisions of counties that had been listed in schedule F.9 These were then implemented by the Parliamentary Boundaries Act 1832.

The divisions of the county were based on the hundreds of Lancashire. The hundreds of Amounderness, Blackburn, Leyland and Lonsdale were allocated to the Northern division, and the Salford and West Derby hundreds were allocated to the Southern division. The boundary of the two divisions extended approximately from Southport to Wigan, north to Chorley, and then east, passing south of Haslingden, to the Bacup area.

The result of these changes meant the total parliamentary representation for Lancashire in the reformed House of Commons was 26, an increase of 12. Lancashire benefited more than any other county as a result of these reforms.

The constituency was abolished by the Redistribution of Seats Act 1885, being divided into five single member divisions of Barrow-in-Furness, Blackpool, Chorley, Lancaster, and North Lonsdale.

== Boundaries ==
1832–1868: The Hundreds of Lonsdale, Amounderness, Leyland and Blackburn.

1868–1885: The Hundreds of Lonsdale, Amounderness and Leyland.

== Members of Parliament ==
- Constituency created (1832)

Election	1st Member	1st Party	2nd Member	2nd Party
1832	John Wilson-Patten	Tory	Hon. Edward Stanley	Whig
1834	John Wilson-Patten	Conservative	Hon. Edward Stanley	Whig
1837	John Wilson-Patten	Conservative	Hon. Edward Stanley	Conservative
1844 by-election	John Wilson-Patten	Conservative	John Talbot Clifton	Conservative
1846	John Wilson-Patten	Peelite	John Talbot Clifton	Conservative
1847	John Wilson-Patten	Peelite	James Heywood	Whig
1852	John Wilson-Patten	Conservative	James Heywood	Whig
1857	John Wilson-Patten	Conservative	Lord Cavendish of Keighley	Whig
1859	John Wilson-Patten	Conservative	Lord Cavendish of Keighley	Liberal
1868	John Wilson-Patten	Conservative	Hon. Frederick Stanley	Conservative
1874 by-election	Thomas Henry Clifton	Conservative	Hon. Frederick Stanley	Conservative
1880	Joseph Feilden	Conservative	Hon. Frederick Stanley	Conservative
1885	Constituency abolished (1885)			

== Elections ==
=== Elections in the 1830s ===
General election 1832: North Lancashire
Party	Candidate	Votes	%
Tory	John Wilson-Patten	Unopposed	
Whig	Edward Smith-Stanley	Unopposed	
Registered electors		6,593	
Tory win (new seat)			
Whig win (new seat)			

Smith-Stanley was appointed as Secretary of State for War and the Colonies, requiring a by-election.

By-election, 12 April 1833: North Lancashire
Party	Candidate	Votes	%
Whig	Edward Smith-Stanley	Unopposed	
Whig hold			

General election 1835: North Lancashire
Party	Candidate	Votes	%
Conservative	John Wilson-Patten	Unopposed	
Whig	Lord Stanley	Unopposed	
Registered electors		6,581	
Conservative hold			
Whig hold			

General election 1837: North Lancashire
Party	Candidate	Votes	%
Conservative	John Wilson-Patten	Unopposed	
Conservative	Lord Stanley	Unopposed	
Registered electors		9,691	
Conservative hold			
Conservative gain from Whig			

=== Elections in the 1840s ===
General election 1841: North Lancashire
Party	Candidate	Votes	%	±%
Conservative	John Wilson-Patten	Unopposed		
Conservative	Lord Stanley	Unopposed		
Registered electors		10,031		
Conservative hold				
Conservative hold				

Smith-Stanley was appointed Secretary of State for War and the Colonies, requiring a by-election.

By-election, 21 September 1841: North Lancashire
Party	Candidate	Votes	%	±%
Conservative	Lord Stanley	Unopposed		
Conservative hold				

Smith-Stanley resigned, causing a by-election.

By-election, 20 September 1844: North Lancashire
Party	Candidate	Votes	%	±%
Conservative	John Talbot Clifton	Unopposed		
Conservative hold				

General election 1847: North Lancashire
Party	Candidate	Votes	%	±%
Peelite	John Wilson-Patten	Unopposed		
Whig	James Heywood	Unopposed		
Registered electors		11,846		
Peelite gain from Conservative				
Whig gain from Conservative				

=== Elections in the 1850s ===
General election 1852: North Lancashire
Party	Candidate	Votes	%	±%
Conservative	John Wilson-Patten	Unopposed		
Whig	James Heywood	Unopposed		
Registered electors		12,297		
Conservative gain from Peelite				
Whig hold				

General election 1857: North Lancashire
Party	Candidate	Votes	%	±%
Conservative	John Wilson-Patten	Unopposed		
Whig	Lord Cavendish of Keighley	Unopposed		
Registered electors		12,352		
Conservative hold				
Whig hold				

General election 1859: North Lancashire
Party	Candidate	Votes	%	±%
Conservative	John Wilson-Patten	Unopposed		
Liberal	Marquess of Hartington	Unopposed		
Registered electors		12,183		
Conservative hold				
Liberal hold				

=== Elections in the 1860s ===
Cavendish was appointed a Civil Lord of the Admiralty, requiring a by-election.

By-election, 24 March 1863: North Lancashire
Party	Candidate	Votes	%	±%
Liberal	Marquess of Hartington	Unopposed		
Liberal hold				

General election 1865: North Lancashire
Party	Candidate	Votes	%	±%
Conservative	John Wilson-Patten	Unopposed		
Liberal	Marquess of Hartington	Unopposed		
Registered electors		13,006		
Conservative hold				
Liberal hold				

Cavendish was appointed Secretary of State for War, requiring a by-election.

By-election, 28 February 1866: North Lancashire
Party	Candidate	Votes	%	±%
Liberal	Marquess of Hartington	Unopposed		
Liberal hold				

Wilson-Patten was appointed Chancellor of the Duchy of Lancaster, requiring a by-election.

By-election, 1 July 1867: North Lancashire
Party	Candidate	Votes	%	±%
Conservative	John Wilson-Patten	Unopposed		
Conservative hold				

General election 1868: North Lancashire
Party	Candidate	Votes	%	±%
Conservative	Frederick Stanley	6,832	36.3	N/A
Conservative	John Wilson-Patten	6,681	35.5	N/A
Liberal	Marquess of Hartington	5,296	28.2	N/A
Majority		1,536	8.1	N/A
Turnout		12,053 (est)	83.7 (est)	N/A
Registered electors		14,399		
Conservative hold				
Conservative gain from Liberal				

=== Elections in the 1870s ===
General election 1874: North Lancashire
Party	Candidate	Votes	%	±%
Conservative	John Wilson-Patten	Unopposed		
Conservative	Frederick Stanley	Unopposed		
Registered electors		14,690		
Conservative hold				
Conservative hold				

Patten was elevated to the peerage, becoming Lord Winmarleigh, causing a by-election.

By-election, 26 Mar 1874: North Lancashire
Party	Candidate	Votes	%	±%
Conservative	Thomas Henry Clifton	Unopposed		
Conservative hold				

Stanley was appointed Secretary of State for War, requiring a by-election.

By-election, 8 Apr 1878: North Lancashire
Party	Candidate	Votes	%	±%
Conservative	Frederick Stanley	Unopposed		
Conservative hold				

=== Elections in the 1880s ===
General election 1880: North Lancashire
Party	Candidate	Votes	%	±%
Conservative	Frederick Stanley	8,172	36.8	N/A
Conservative	Joseph Feilden	7,505	33.8	N/A
Liberal	Thomas Storey	6,500	29.3	New
Majority		1,005	4.5	N/A
Turnout		14,672 (est)	86.0 (est)	N/A
Registered electors		17,057		
Conservative hold		Swing	N/A	
Conservative hold		Swing	N/A	

Stanley was appointed Secretary of State for the Colonies, requiring a by-election.

By-election, 2 Jul 1885: North Lancashire
Party	Candidate	Votes	%	±%
Conservative	Frederick Stanley	Unopposed		
Conservative hold				

== Sources ==
- Leigh Rayment's Historical List of MPs – Constituencies beginning with "L" (part 1)
