= Thomas Henry Clifton =

UK politician (1845–1880)

Thomas Henry Clifton MP JP

Member of Parliament for North Lancashire
- In office 26 March 1874 – 31 March 1880 Serving with Frederick Stanley
- Preceded by: John Wilson-Patten; Frederick Stanley
- Succeeded by: Joseph Feilden; Frederick Stanley

Personal details
- Born: 3 March 1846
- Died: 31 March 1880 (aged 35)
- Resting place: St Cuthbert's Church, Lytham, Lancashire
- Party: Conservative
- Spouse: Madeline Diana Elizabeth Agnew (m. 1867)
- Relations: Tom Cecil Noel (grandson); Harry Clifton (grandson); Graham Kinnaird, 13th Lord Kinnaird (grandson)
- Children: 7, including John
- Parent(s): John Talbot Clifton; Eleanor Cecily Lowther

Thomas Henry Clifton JP (3 March 1845 – 31 March 1880) was a Conservative Party politician in the United Kingdom.

== Early life ==
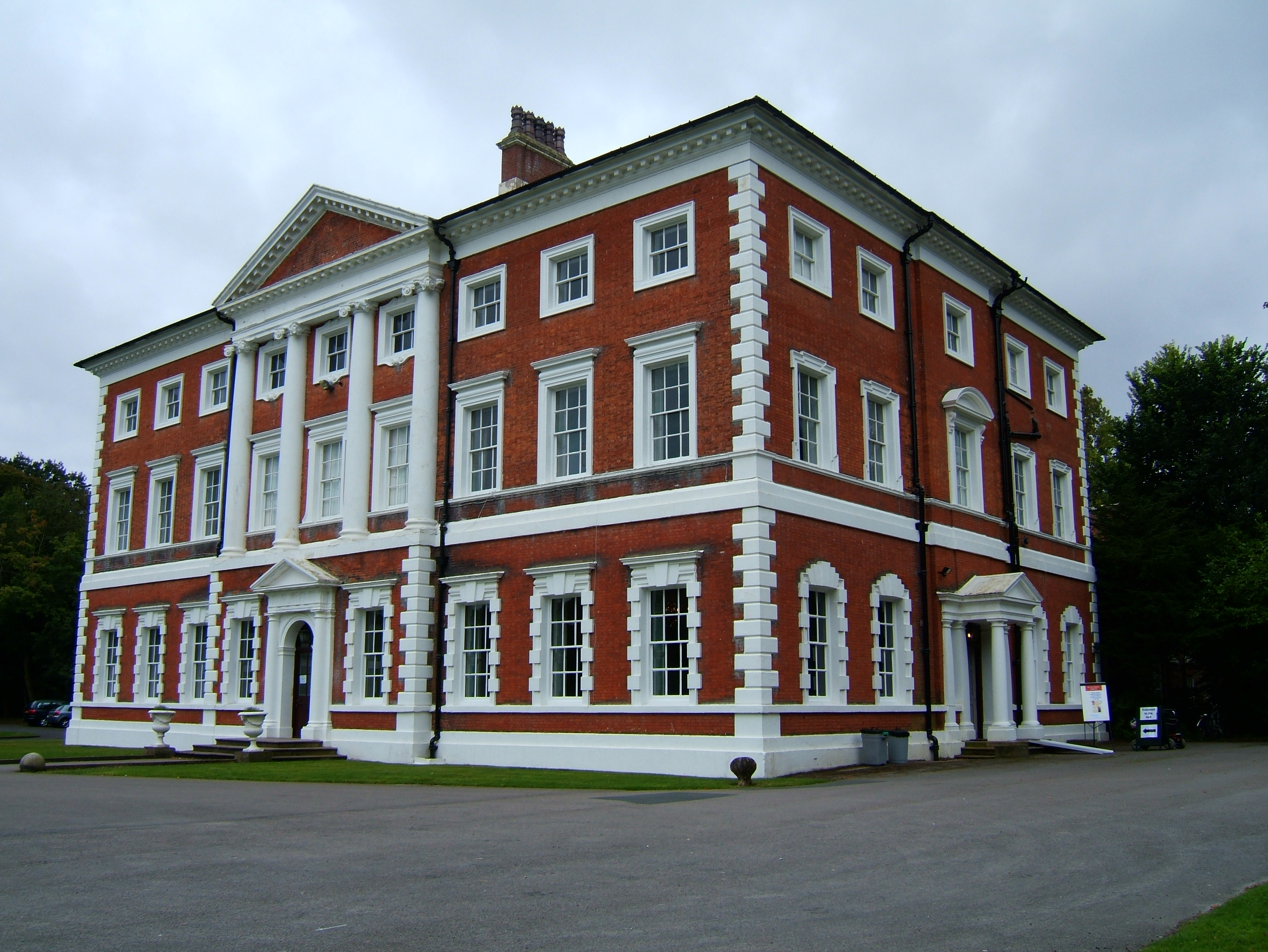
The Clifton family seat, Lytham Hall

Clifton was born on 3 March 1845 into a prestigious Lancashire family. He was the only son of John Talbot Clifton and the Lady Eleanor Cecily Lowther. His father, who succeeded Thomas' grandfather to the Lytham Hall and estate in 1851, was a Member of Parliament for North Lancashire between 1844 and 1847 and died in Algeria in 1882, two years after his death.

His maternal grandparents were the former Lady Lucy Eleanor Sherard (a daughter of Philip Sherard, 5th Earl of Harborough) and Col. Hon. Henry Cecil Lowther of Barleythorpe Hall, MP for Westmorland (the second son of William Lowther, 1st Earl of Lonsdale). His paternal grandparents were Hatty (née Treves) Clifton and Thomas Joseph Clifton.

== Career ==
Clifton followed his father into politics in 1874 when he was elected Conservative MP for North Lancashire at a by-election but died shortly before the next general election in 1880.

During his life, Clifton was also a Justice of the Peace for Lancashire, a Lieutenant in the 1st Regiment of Life Guards, and a Lieutenant of the Lancashire Yeomanry Cavalry.

== Personal life ==
On 7 February 1867, he married Madeline Agnew at St George's, Hanover Square in London. Madeline was one of thirteen children born to the former Lady Mary Arabella Louisa Noel (a daughter of Charles Noel, 1st Earl of Gainsborough) and Sir Andrew Agnew, 8th Baronet, MP for Wigtownshire. Together they had seven children, including:

- Madeline Edith Clifton (1867–1946), who married her cousin Gerard Cecil Noel (1864–1925), a son of Gerard Noel, MP for Rutland, and Lady Augusta Mary (the second daughter of Col. Hon. Henry Cecil Lowther). He was also the nephew of Henry Lowther, 3rd Earl of Lonsdale and a grandson of Charles Noel, 1st Earl of Gainsborough.
- John Talbot Clifton (1868–1928), a noted traveller who married Violet Mary, the daughter of William Nelthorpe Beauclerk and granddaughter of the William Beauclerk, 8th Duke of St Albans in 1907.
- Cuthbert Clifton (1870–1900), who fought in the Boer War and who died, unmarried, from the effects of sunstroke received in South Africa.
- Constance Gertrude Cecil Clifton (1871–1954), who married Capt. Hon. James Frederick Cumming-Bruce, a son of Thomas Hovell-Thurlow-Cumming-Bruce, 5th Baron Thurlow and Lady Elma Bruce (a daughter of James Bruce, 8th Earl of Elgin), in 1891. After his death, she married, secondly, Brig.-Gen. Edward Boustead Cuthbertson, a son of Thomas Cuthbertson, in 1910. She served as Woman of the bedchamber to Princess Helena (the third daughter and fifth child of Queen Victoria and Prince Albert).
- Harry Arthur Clifton (1874–1947), a Lt.-Col. who fought in the Boer War, World War I and was commander of the Scottish Horse; he married Gladys Evans, daughter of Sir Griffith Humphrey Pugh Evans, in 1903.
- Frances Victoria Clifton (1876–1960), who married her cousin, Kenneth Kinnaird, 12th Lord Kinnaird, son of Arthur Kinnaird, 11th Lord Kinnaird and Mary Alma Victoria Agnew.
- Charles Caryl Clifton (1877–1932), a Lt. in the Royal Scots Fusiliers who fought in the Mashonaland Campaign, the Boer War, and World War I; he died unmarried.

Clifton died on 31 March 1880. He was buried at St Cuthbert's Church, Lytham.

Parliament of the United Kingdom
Preceded by John Wilson-Patten; Frederick Stanley	Member of Parliament for North Lancashire; 1874–1880; With: Frederick Stanley	Succeeded by Joseph Feilden; Frederick Stanley
