= The Tell-Tale Heart (disambiguation) =

The Tell-Tale Heart is an 1843 short story by Edgar Allan Poe.

The Tell-Tale Heart may also refer to:

== Films ==
- The Tell-Tale Heart (1928), a 20-minute American silent film co-directed by Leon Shamroy and Charles Klein
- The Tell-Tale Heart (1934 film), also known as Bucket of Blood, a British film directed by Brian Desmond Hurst
- The Tell-Tale Heart (1941 film), an American drama film
- The Tell-Tale Heart (1953 American film), an animated film
- The Tell-Tale Heart (1953 British film), a short film starring Stanley Baker
- The Tell-Tale Heart (1960 film), a British horror film
- The Tell-Tale Heart (1961 film), an Australian ballet
- The Tell-Tale Heart (2014 film), a horror film

== Music ==
- "The Tell-Tale Heart" (song), track on The Alan Parsons Experience's 1976 Tales of Mystery and Imagination album
- "The Tell-Tale Heart", a track from the Tourniquet album Crawl to China

== See also ==
- Tell Tale Hearts, a BBC Scotland television serial drama
- "The Telltale Head", an episode of The Simpsons TV series based on the Poe story
