= Harry Clifton (producer) =

British film producer (1907–1979)

- Born: Henry Talbot de Vere Clifton; 16 December 1907
- Died: 26 November 1979 (aged 71)
- Education: Oxford University
- Occupations: Film producer, poet and landowner
- Spouse: Lilian Lowell Griswold (1937–1943)
- Parent(s): John Talbot Clifton; Violet Mary Beauclerk

Henry Talbot de Vere Clifton (16 December 1907 – 26 November 1979) was an eccentric, British aristocrat, poet, race horse owner, art collector and film producer. He spent some time in Hollywood during the early 1930s and, in the mid 1930s, produced films in Britain. In the 1930s and 1940s he had three books of poetry published.

== Early life ==
He was born on 16 December 1907, the son of John Talbot Clifton and Violet Mary Beauclerk, from a very wealthy family with extensive estates and other property holdings in England and Scotland. He was educated at Downside School and Oxford University. He knew the novelist Evelyn Waugh, having possibly met him at Oxford, and who is thought by some to have used him as a model for the Brideshead Revisited character, Sebastian Flyte, although other sources (e.g. Paula Byrne) attribute the inspiration to Hugh Lygon. Waugh was certainly a guest at the family seat, Lytham Hall, in the 1930s and described the Clifton family as “tearing mad”. Clifton's mother, Violet, believed that much of Brideshead Revisited was about the Clifton family and was furious when it was published. After leaving Oxford, Clifton travelled in the Far East and the United States.

== Property ==
When his father died in 1928 Clifton became the owner of 8,000 acres of prime farmland and Lytham Hall in Lancashire, 16,000 acres of moorland and a house called Kildalton Castle on the isle of Islay in Scotland and all the ground rents of the town of Lytham St Annes in Lancashire. Because his father died a few months before Clifton was 21 years old the entail of the estate, by law, ended. Clifton was the outright owner and could legally sell property which had been in the family for hundreds of years. Once the death duties had been paid on his estates he began to spend on a grand scale.

In 1938, he bought Rufford Abbey (formerly owned by the Talbot family), but neglected it and, in 1952, the abbey and 150 acres of grounds were bought by Nottinghamshire County Council. It is thought that he intended to turn the property into a film studio but it is doubtful that he visited Rufford more than once. The scheme, as with so many of his plans, came to nothing and the once stately home is now mostly ruinous.

Clifton maintained a suite at the Ritz Hotel in London and decided to take on another at the nearby Dorchester Hotel. When asked why he replied, "If I'm passing down Park Lane and feel tired, then I've got somewhere to go."

== Personal life ==
Clifton had a great interest in the occult and became involved in the US with Rev. Violet Greener the leader of the Agabeg Occult Temple, who was known as "The Ghost of Hollywood". He gave her £40,000 and some valuable jewellery in the 1930s.

Clifton's friend and partner in the short lived Clifton Hurst Productions was the film director Brian Desmond Hurst. He told the story of Clifton, believing in a deity he called "the White Goddess" and dining with her at the Ritz once a fortnight. A meal was served for two and Clifton talked happily to himself for hours or at least "the White Goddess" did not make herself visible to the waiters and diners.

He married Lilian Lowell Griswold in 1937. During their marriage he bought two Fabergé eggs, the Renaissance Egg in 1937 and later the Rosebud Egg, but these famous tokens of love and affection did not guarantee a long marriage: the couple divorced in 1943.

In 1938, he instructed his chauffeur to drive him from Preston to Lytham without stopping (at threat of being sacked), not even at the gates of his property, so smashed through the gates, damaging the car.

He died childless in 1979, having squandered his family's wealth of several million pounds and sold their thousands of acres of land and other properties including the family seat of Lytham Hall that had belonged to the Clifton family since 1606. When he died he was almost penniless and was residing in a small rundown hotel in Brighton.

== Career ==
The IMDb lists one "Harry Clifton" as both an actor and a producer, with his first film as an actor being the 1908 version of the tale of the Younger brothers; however, Henry Talbot de Vere Clifton was only one year old at the time. Several other acting roles are credited to "Harry Clifton" up to 1919, which also appear to belong to a different Harry Clifton. However, he did act as an extra in at least one Hollywood film directed by John Ford. Harry Clifton produced two British films in the mid-1930s, both for his friend Brian Desmond Hurst. He wrote a £3,000 cheque on an opened cigarette packet to finance The Tell-Tale Heart: the "cheque" was honoured by the bank. In 1963, he financed the Circlorama cinema (which used the Circular Kinopanorama process) near Piccadilly Circus in London, and requested that the filmmakers make a film with some hobgoblins in it, but the ensuing film, Circlorama Cavalcade, instead featured circus lions, Formula Two cars, ice skaters, trains at Clapham Junction and The Swinging Blue Jeans.

Clifton's three book of poetry were published by Duckworth. The first was Dielma and Other Poems in 1932 and then followed Flight in 1934. One commentator has said that "Clifton was particularly adroit at poems honouring – and marvelling at – women" and the Times Literary Supplement stated that "His lyrics are a gracious tribute to the beauty of women". These were fairly conventional poems, unlike his final work, Gleams Britain's Day, published in 1942. The Spectator described it as "expressing in a sort of prophetic certitude opinions upon religion, patriotism, love, art, war and peace, which he puts in unconventional verse". The reviewer stated that the book was "the product of a curious, whimsical mind, full of energy, squandering it on half-digested ideas". W. B. Yeats dedicated his poem, "Lapis Lazuli", to Clifton who had given him a valuable Chinese lapis lazuli carving.

During the 1930s, Clifton was a racehorse owner and amateur jockey. He was an art collector and owned paintings by Renoir, Gauguin and Tissot; all of which he later sold to pay off his debts.

Clifton was a gambler and, in 1957, the Evening Standard described his behaviour in the Monte Carlo casino: "Tall, bearded, always dressed in heavy tweeds with a heavy brown scarf wrapped around his neck... he is notable for heavy gambling carried out with the appearance of complete unconcern, and sudden outbursts of indiscriminate generosity". He often fell prey to conmen and lost a great deal of money through ill advised business deals. When warned that one of his acquaintances was dangerous he replied. "Oh, I know, but you see I like bad types!" Many of his projects were started with great enthusiasm but he quickly lost interest and dropped them, these included the construction of a zoo and plans for a new town on his Lancashire estate.

== Filmography ==
- The Tell-Tale Heart (1934) (as producer)
- Irish Hearts (1934) (as producer)
- Circlorama Cavalcade (1964) (as backer)
