= 1878 North Lancashire by-election =

UK Parliamentary by-election

The 1878 North Lancashire by-election was held on 8 April 1878. The by-election in the North Lancashire constituency was fought due to the incumbent Conservative MP, Frederick Stanley later known as Lord Stanley, becoming Secretary of State for War and in the normal practice of the time, he vacated the seat in his appointment to the Cabinet, to be returned unopposed.
