= 1874 North Lancashire by-election =

UK Parliamentary by-election

The 1874 North Lancashire by-election was fought on 26 March 1874. The by-election in the North Lancashire constituency was fought due to the elevation to the peerage of the incumbent Conservative MP, John Wilson-Patten. It was won by the Conservative candidate Thomas Henry Clifton who was unopposed.
