= Randle Feilden =

British army officer and horse racing administrator

Major-General Sir Randle Feilden KCVO CB CBE DL
- Feilden in November 1949
- Born: 14 June 1904
- Died: 27 October 1981 (aged 77); Minster Lovell, Oxfordshire, England
- Relatives: Joseph Feilden (grandfather); Henry Brand, 2nd Viscount Hampden (grandfather)
- Military career
- Allegiance: United Kingdom
- Branch: British Army
- Service years: 1925–1949
- Rank: Major-General
- Nickname: Gerry
- Service number: 37199
- Unit: Coldstream Guards
- Conflicts: Second World War: Battle of France; North-West Europe Campaign of 1944–45
- Awards: Knight Commander of the Royal Victorian Order; Companion of the Order of the Bath; Commander of the Order of the British Empire; Knight Grand Officer of the Order of Orange Nassau (Netherlands); Legion of Merit (United States)
- Other work: Senior steward of the Jockey Club

Major-General Sir Randle Guy "Gerry" Feilden, KCVO, CB, CBE, DL (14 June 1904 – 27 October 1981) was a general officer in the British Army. During the Second World War, he was the deputy quartermaster general of the 21st Army Group in the North-West Europe Campaign of 1944–45. After the war, he became the senior steward of the Jockey Club. He is commemorated by the annual Feilden Stakes at Newmarket Racecourse.

== Early life ==
Randle Guy Feilden was born on 14 June 1904, the son of Major Percy Henry Guy Feilden, the son of Lieutenant General Randle Joseph Feilden and his wife the Honorable Dorothy Louisa Brand, the daughter of Henry Brand, 2nd Viscount Hampden. He had a younger brother, Cecil Henry Feilden, and a younger sister, Dorothy Priscilla Feilden. He was educated at Eton College and the University of Cambridge.

== Military career ==
Feilden was commissioned into the Coldstream Guards in 1925 as a second lieutenant. He was nicknamed "Gerry" and was always referred to by this name. He was promoted to lieutenant on 14 December 1928. On 22 October 1929 he married Mary Joyce Ramsden, the daughter of Sir John Frescheville Ramsden, 6th Baronet. They had three children: Randle Joseph, Cecil Roderick and Andrew James Feilden. He was aide de camp to the general officer commanding the London District, Major General Bertram Sergison-Brooke, from 1 March 1934 to 1 October 1937, and as such participated in the coronation of King George VI and Queen Elizabeth on 12 May 1937. He was promoted to captain on 29 December 1936. After this appointment, he became adjutant of the 1st Battalion, Coldstream Guards.

In 1939, Feilden became a staff captain, and then brigade major, on the staff of the 7th Guards Brigade, part of Major General Bernard Montgomery's 3rd Division. Montgomery had him transferred to his 3rd Division headquarters (HQ) staff as deputy assistant quartermaster general. After Montgomery assumed command of V Corps in July 1941, he brought Feilden onto his corps staff as assistant quartermaster general. In 1941, Feilden became assistant adjutant and quartermaster general of the newly formed Guards Armoured Division. He was promoted to major on 14 December 1942. He then became deputy quartermaster general (DQMG) at Home Forces HQ. He was made an Officer of the Order of the British Empire on 2 June 1943.

When the 21st Army Group was formed in 1943, Feilden joined its staff as DQMG (Maintenance and Army Equipment). Since he was well known to Montgomery, he survived the purge of the staff when Montgomery took over in December 1943. As the major general administration (MGA), Miles Graham, was usually with the Main 21st Army Group HQ, Feilden was normally the senior officer at the Rear 21st Army Group HQ. He was made a Companion of the Order of the Bath on 28 September 1944, and was promoted to major general on 23 January 1945. A request from Admiral Lord Louis Mountbatten for Feilden to be posted to Allied Land Forces South East Asia was declined by Montgomery, and Feilden remained with 21st Army Group.

For his services, Feilden was mentioned in despatches on 9 August and 8 November 1945, and was made a Commander of the Order of the British Empire on 24 January 1946. He also received foreign awards, including being made an officer of the United States Legion of Merit on 13 March 1945, and a Grand Officer of the Netherlands Order of Orange Nassau with Swords on 24 June 1947. After the war, Feilden was quartermaster general (QMG) of the British Army of the Rhine from 1945 to 1946, and then vice QMG at the War Office from 1947 until his retirement from the Army in 1949.

== Later life ==
In 1952, Feilden became a steward of the Jockey Club, and went on to become chief steward. He became a Knight Commander of the Royal Victorian Order in the 1953 Coronation Honours. As senior steward he was responsible for the introduction of starting stalls, and arranged for the Jockey Club to be given a royal charter in 1970 by Queen Elizabeth II, the first to be granted to any sporting body. He was chairman of the Turf Board from 1965 to 1967, and became High Sheriff of Oxfordshire in 1971, and a deputy lieutenant on 24 January 1975. He lived at Old Manor House, Minster Lovell, Oxfordshire, where he died on 27 October 1981. An annual horse race, the Feilden Stakes, was named in his memory in 1982.

== Bibliography ==
- Mead, Richard (2015). The Men Behind Monty. Barnsley, Yorkshire: Pen and Sword. ISBN 978-1-47382-716-5. OCLC 922926980.
- Smart, Nick (2005). Biographical Dictionary of British Generals of the Second World War. Barnsley, Yorkshire: Pen and Sword. ISBN 978-1-84415-049-6. OCLC 58555546.
- Torday, Jane; Mortimer, Roger (2015). Dearest Jane... :My Father's Life and Letters. London: Constable. ISBN 978-1-4721-2112-7. OCLC 922032746.
