= Joseph Feilden (British Army officer) =

British army general & politician (1824-1895)

Lieutenant-General Joseph Feilden CMG
- Born: 1824; Clifton, Bristol
- Died: 19 May 1895 (aged 70–71)
- Spouse: Jane Campell Hozier (m. 1861–1895)
- Children: 4
- Relatives: Joseph Feilden (father); Randle Feilden (grandson)
- Military career
- Allegiance: United Kingdom
- Branch: British Army
- Service years: 1843–1876
- Rank: Lieutenant-General
- Commands: 1st Battalion 60th Rifles
- Conflicts: Red River Rebellion; Wolseley expedition

Lieutenant-General Randle Joseph Feilden CMG (1824 – 19 May 1895) was a British Army officer, businessman and Conservative politician who represented several Lancashire constituencies.

== Life ==
Feilden was born at Clifton, Bristol, the second son of Joseph Feilden of Witton Park, Lancashire, and Frances Mary née Master. A brother was Canon Feilden.

Feilden joined the British Army in 1843, becoming a second lieutenant in the 60th Rifles on 31 March. He was promoted to lieutenant on 25 February 1845, before being advanced to captain on 23 December 1853 and then major on 18 May 1860. Appointed a lieutenant-colonel on 1 March 1864 and a colonel on 1 March 1869, by 1870 he had taken command of the 1st Battalion of the 60th Rifles. He commanded 250 men of his battalion during the Wolseley expedition, in Canada, combatting the Red River Rebellion.

For his services in the campaign Feilden was appointed a Companion of the Order of St Michael and St George, although during operations he was criticized by soldier Sam Steele for being "too cautious about overworking his men", leading to his columns moving more slowly than expected. He went on half pay in January 1876, before being promoted to major-general in 1880.

Feilden was elected MP for North Lancashire in 1880, and when the constituency was restructured became MP for Chorley. He held the seat until his death. He also served as a magistrate for Lancaster. Feilden died on 19 May 1895.

== Family ==
In 1861, Feilden married his first cousin once removed, Jane Campbell Hozier, daughter of James Hozier, Esq. of Maudslie Castle, Lanarkshire, by Catherine Margaret, second daughter of Sir William Feilden, 1st Baronet. Among their children were:

- Randle Francis Joseph Feilden
- Major Cecil William Montague Feilden DSO (13 March 1863–19 February 1902), Royal Scots Greys officer mortally wounded serving in the Second Boer War.
- Captain Reginald St. Lawrence Feilden
- Major James Hawley Gilbert Feilden (b. 1867), King's Royal Rifle Corps officer.
- Major Percy Henry Guy Feilden (1870–1944), King's Royal Rifle Corps officer, whose son was:

- Major-General Sir Randle Guy Feilden (14 June 1904 – 27 October 1981)

== Citations ==
Parliament of the United Kingdom
Preceded by Frederick Stanley; Thomas Henry Clifton	Member of Parliament for North Lancashire; 1880–1885; With: Frederick Stanley	Constituency abolished
New constituency	Member of Parliament for Chorley; 1885–1895	Succeeded by Lord Balniel
