= Lytham Hall =

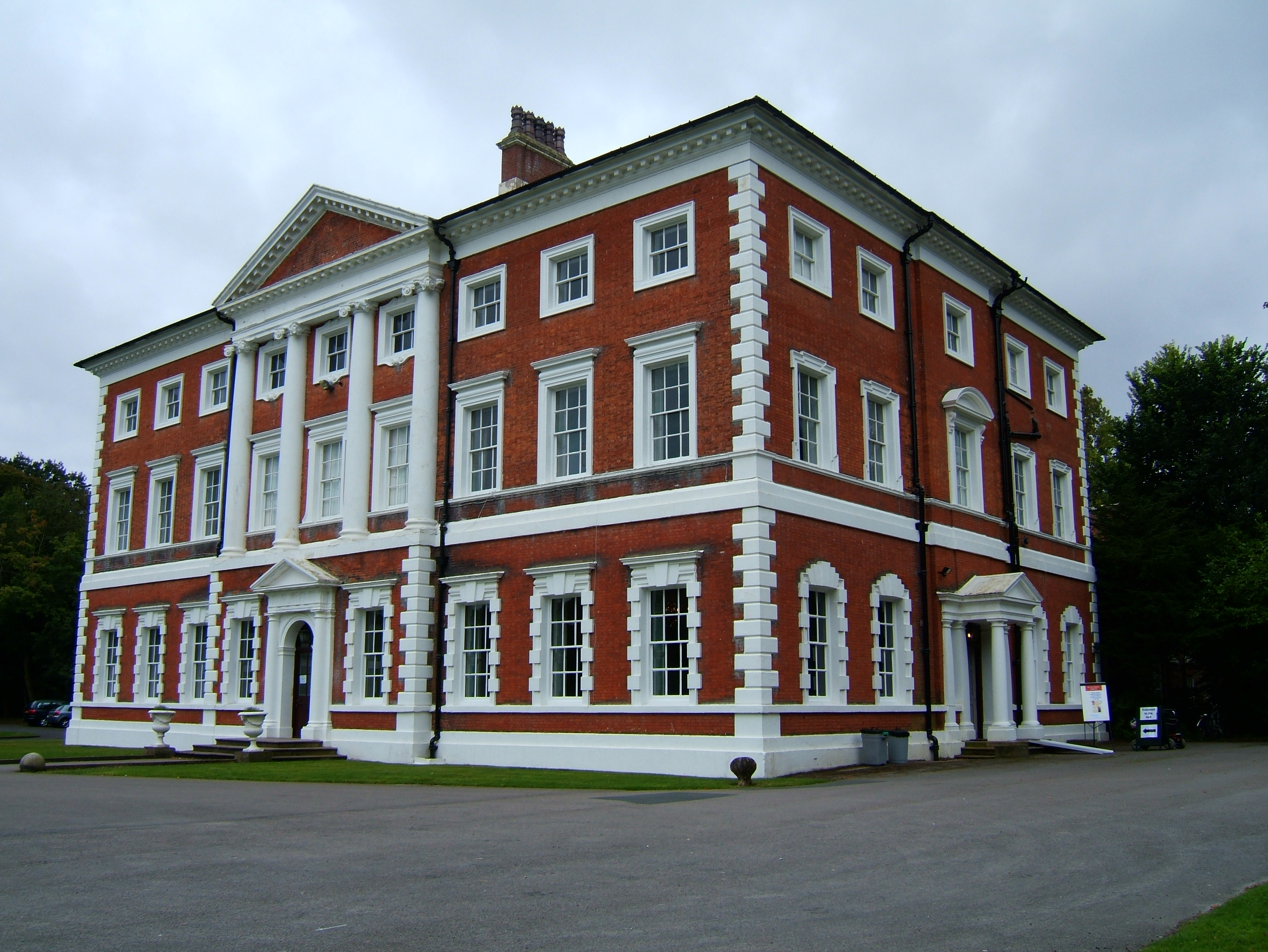

- Location within Lytham St Annes
- 53.7441°N 2.9768°W
- Location: Lytham, Lancashire

History
- Built: 1757–1764

Site notes
- Architect: John Carr
- Architectural style: Neo-Palladian
- Governing body: Heritage Trust for the North West
- Website: Official website

Listed Building – Grade I
- Designated: 1 December 1965
- Reference no.: 1219078

Lytham Hall is an 18th-century Georgian country house in Lytham, Lancashire, 1 mile (1.6 km) from the centre of the town, in 78 acres (32 ha) of wooded parkland. It is recorded in the National Heritage List for England as a designated Grade I listed building, the only one in the Borough of Fylde.

== History ==
The manor of Lytham was recorded in the Domesday Book of 1086 as Lidun. In the 12th century it was given to the Benedictine monks of Durham Priory for the foundation of a monastic cell—Lytham Priory. Following the Dissolution of the Monasteries in the 1530s, Lytham Priory came into the possession of Sir Richard Molyneux. In 1606 the land was acquired by local landowner Cuthbert Clifton, who built a house there. His descendant, Thomas Clifton, partially replaced that house with the current hall, which was built 1757–1764 to the design of John Carr of York. For the next two centuries the Clifton estate, at its largest, comprised 8,000 acres (3,200 ha).

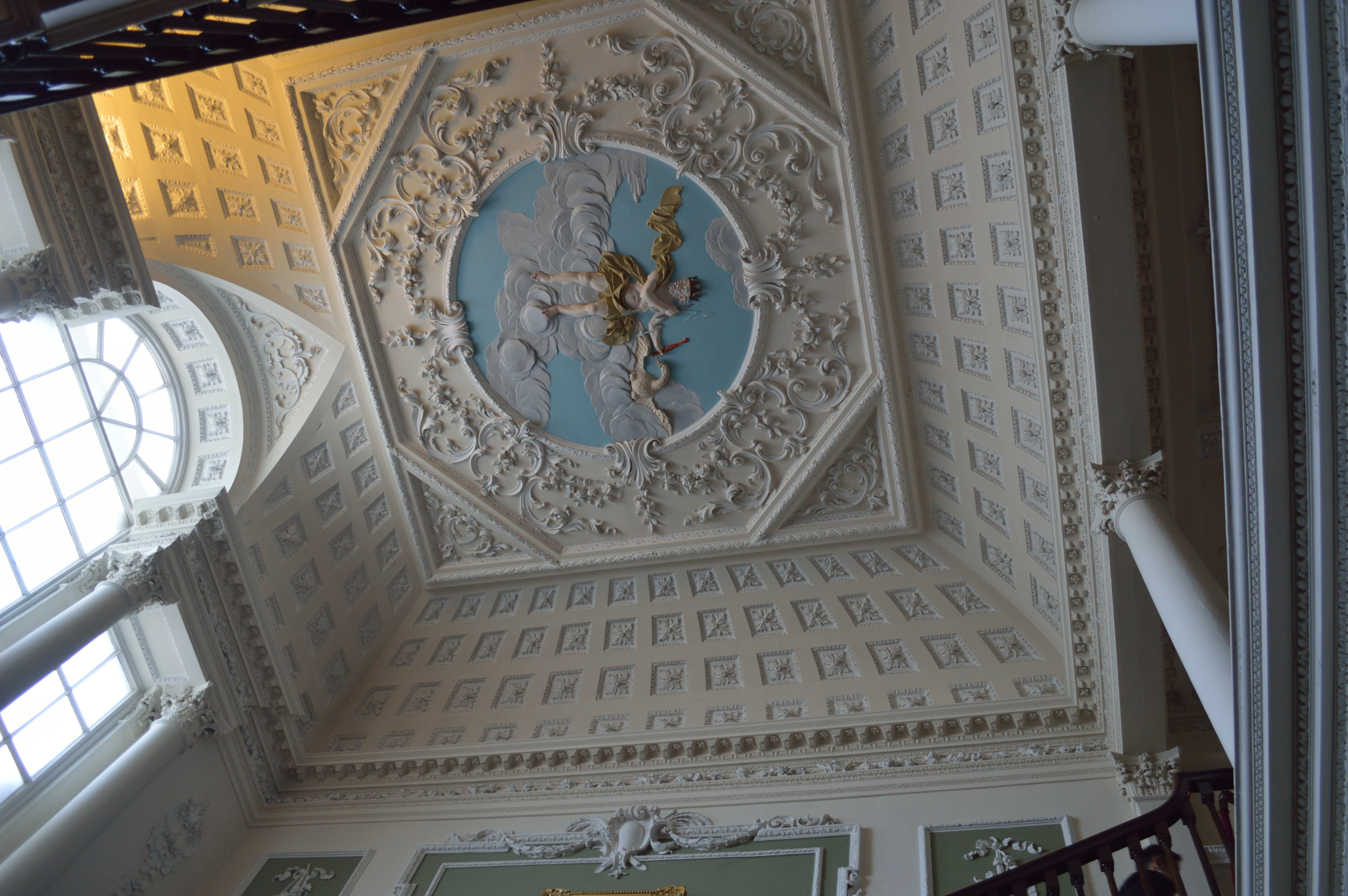
Stairway ceiling, with a central relief of Jupiter hurling thunderbolts

Ownership of the property descended to John Clifton (1764–1832) and thence to his son Thomas Joseph Clifton (1788–1851), who extensively remodelled the estate by extending the surrounding parkland. It passed via Colonel John Talbot Clifton (1819–1882), MP for North Lancashire, to his 14-year-old grandson, the colourful John Talbot Clifton (1868–1928), during whose stewardship the railway was built along the estate's southern boundary and part of the land sold for housing. During the First World War the house was used as a military hospital, and after the Cliftons had moved to live in Ireland in 1919 and then Scotland in 1922 the house was somewhat neglected. Clifton was a passionate traveller and died in 1928 on an expedition to Timbuktu with his wife, Violet Beauclerk. She later wrote a biography of her husband, published under the title The Book of Talbot, which won the 1933 James Tait Black Prize, and was the last person to live in the house. Their dilettante film producer son, Henry de Vere Clifton, had squandered much of the family's wealth and the house had to be sold to Guardian Royal Exchange Assurance in 1963 for office accommodation.

On 1 December 1965, Lytham Hall was designated as a Grade I listed building. The Grade I designation is the highest of the three grades.

In 1997, Lytham Town Trust bought the building, with help from a donation from BAE Systems, and subsequently leased it to Heritage Trust for the North West for 99 years.

== Architecture ==
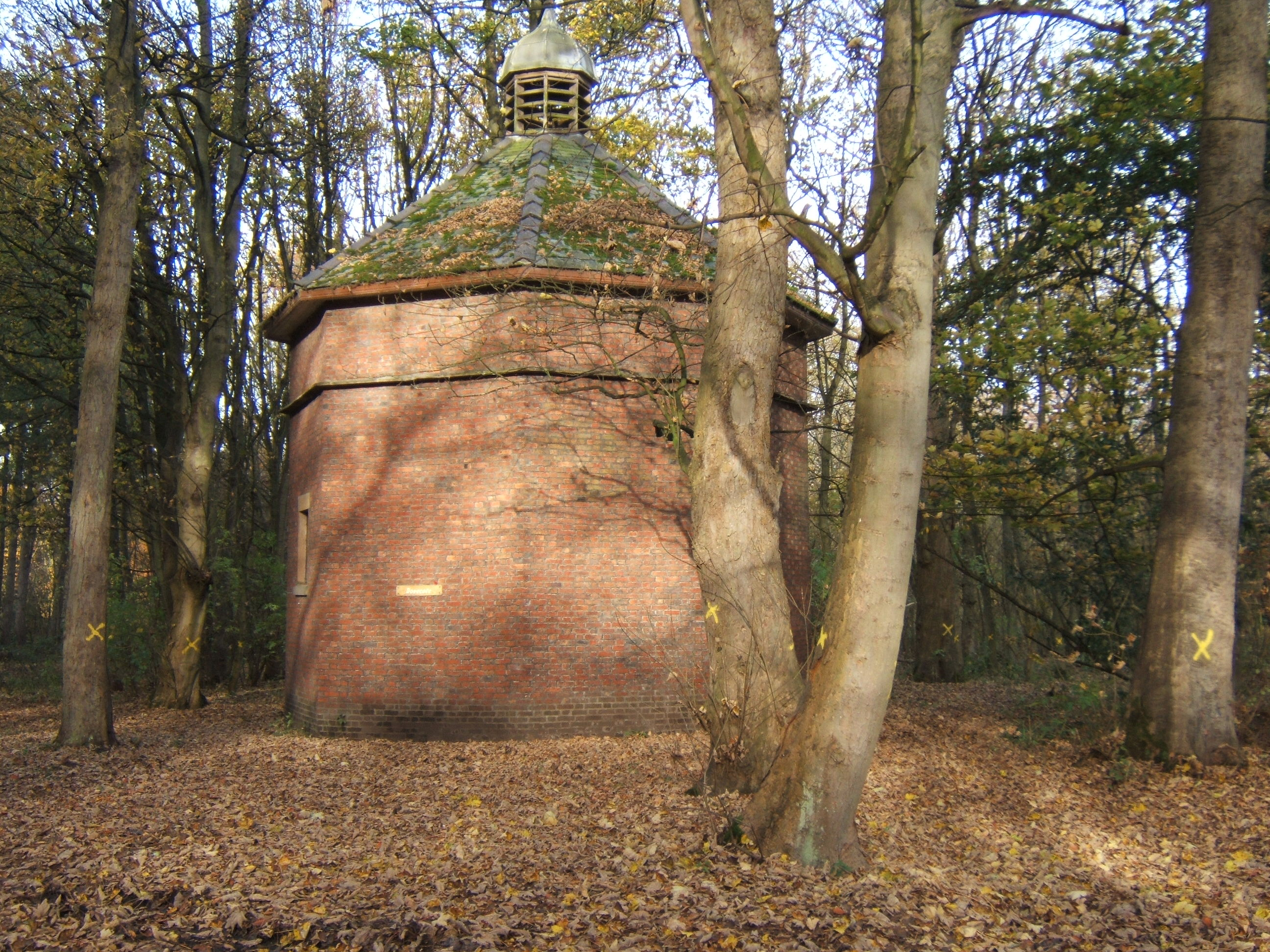
Dovecote in trees at rear

Lytham Hall is constructed in the Neo-Palladian style of red brick in Flemish bond, with stone dressings and stuccoed features. It has three storeys on a rectangular, symmetrical plan and sits on a stone plinth. The front façade lies to the east; it has a central bay that extends slightly forward and has an Ionic pediment. The main entrance is also pedimented and is flanked by Doric columns. There are four pilasters between the first floor and roof cornice. The ground floor windows have Gibbs surrounds.

In contrast to traditional Palladian-style houses in which the servants' and utility rooms were on the ground floor (piano rustico) and the important family rooms were on the first floor (piano nobile), Lytham Hall's main rooms are on the ground floor.

The courtyard behind the main Georgian hall and the attached wings were part of the earlier Jacobean hall of 1606.

In the grounds are several Grade II listed structures, including the Gatehouse, a large stable block, a large dovecote, the inner gates, a statue of Diana in what used to be a formal garden, and a screen wall running south from the west wing. Lytham Hall is described on its website as "the finest Georgian house in Lancashire."

== See also ==
- Grade I listed buildings in Lancashire
- Grade II* listed buildings in Lancashire
- Listed buildings in Lytham
