= John Talbot Clifton (politician) =

English landowner and MP (1819–1882)

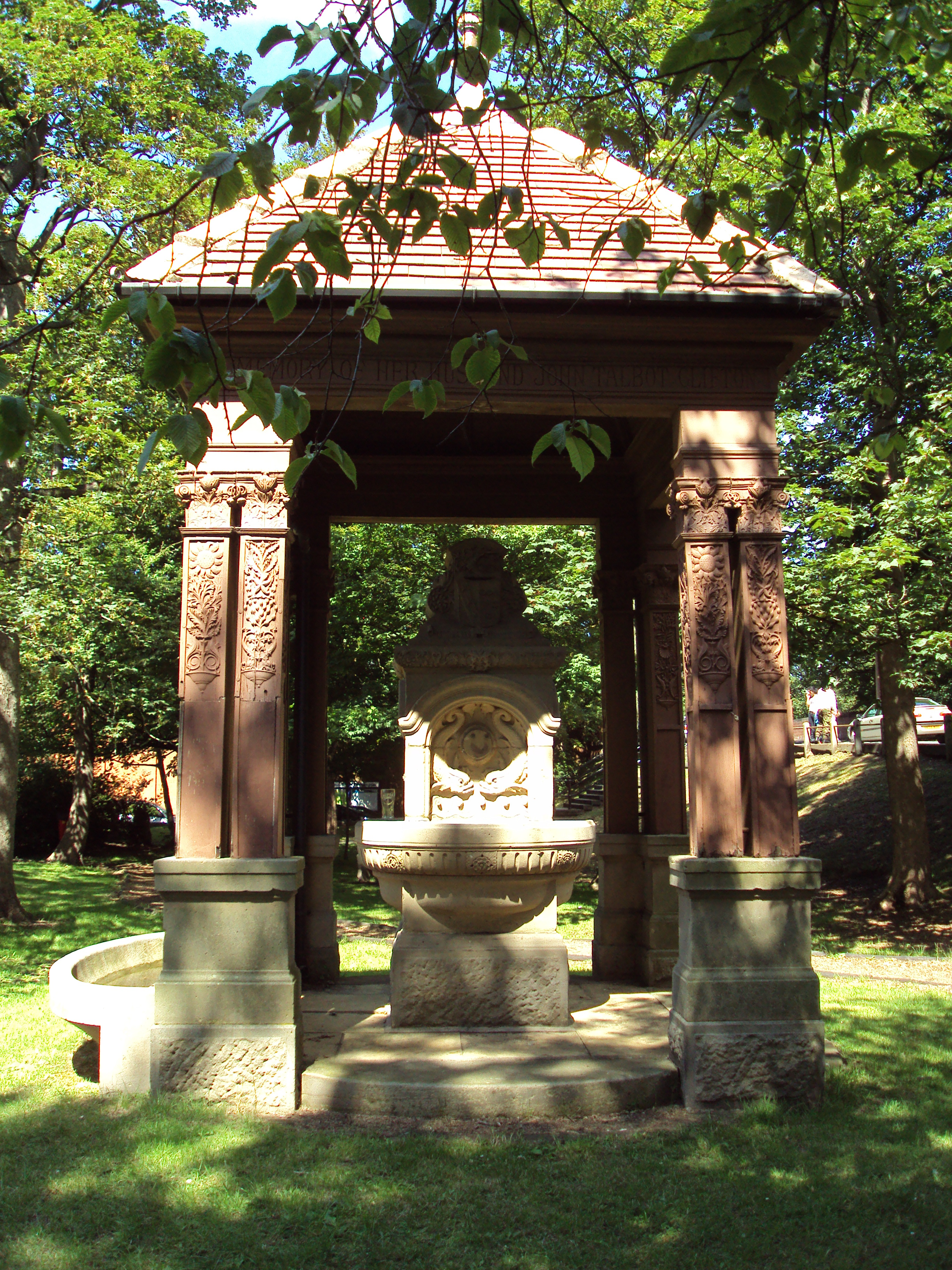
John Talbot Clifton memorial fountain, Lytham

John Talbot Clifton (5 March 1819 – 16 April 1882) was an English landowner and Member of Parliament.

== Life ==
He was born into a noted Lancashire family, the son of Thomas Joseph Clifton of Lytham Hall, Lytham, Lancashire and his wife Hatty Treves. He was educated at Eton College, and matriculated at Christ Church, Oxford in 1837. He succeeded his father to the Lytham estate in 1851.

He served as a justice of the peace and deputy lieutenant for Lancashire and was Colonel of the 1st Royal Lancashire Militia (The Duke of Lancaster's Own). He was elected to Parliament as MP for North Lancashire for 1844–1847, but was a losing candidate in the 1859 election for Preston. He was appointed High Sheriff of Lancashire for 1853.

Clifton died in Algeria in 1882 and was buried at St Cuthberts church, Lytham. He had married Lady Eleanor Cecily Lowther, daughter of Col. Henry Cecil Lowther. He was succeeded by his grandson John Talbot Clifton, his only son, Thomas Henry, who was also MP for North Lancashire, having predeceased him by two years.

A grade II listed drinking fountain as a monument to his memory now stands in Lytham's Sparrow Park.

Parliament of the United Kingdom
| Preceded by John Wilson-Patten; Hon. Edward Smith-Stanley | Member of Parliament for North Lancashire; 1844 – 1847; With: John Wilson-Patten | Succeeded by John Wilson-Patten; James Heywood |
