= Violet Clifton =

English writer

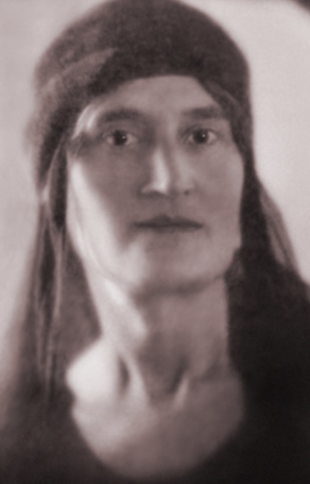
- Photograph (c. 1930s)
- Born: Violet Mary Beauclerk; 2 November 1883; Rome, Italy
- Died: 20 November 1961 (aged 78); Lytham St Annes, Fylde, Lancashire, England
- Spouse: John Talbot Clifton (m. 1907–1928)

Violet Mary Clifton (née Beauclerk) (2 November 1883 (Rome) – 20 November 1961) was an English writer.

== Biography ==
She was a descendant of Charles Beauclerk, 1st Duke of St Albans, the illegitimate son of king Charles II and Nell Gwyn.

She married English landowner and traveller John Talbot Clifton (1868-1928) in 1907 in Brompton Oratory, London, whom she had met in Peru. They lived in the Clifton family seat at Lytham Hall, Lancashire, Kylemore House in Connemara, Ireland, and then at Kildalton Castle on the Scottish island of Islay. After her husband died in 1928 in the Canary Islands on the way home from an abortive expedition to Timbuktu she had his body embalmed and accompanied it back to Scotland for burial,

Her biography of her colourful husband, published under the title The Book of Talbot, won the 1933 James Tait Black Prize. WH Auden praised the book in a review that appeared in the Criterion. In 1935 Nevill Coghill nominated her for the Nobel Prize in Literature, but the prize was ultimately not awarded that year.

Her other books include Vision of Peru and Islands of Queen Wilhelmina, later reissued as Islands of Indonesia.

She died at Lytham Hall in 1961. John and Violet's son was the dilettante film producer Harry Talbot de Vere Clifton, who squandered much of the family's remaining wealth. Harry Clifton gifted a carved Lapis Lazuli to William Butler Yeats, inspiring the poem Lapis Lazuli.

== Publications ==
- Pilgrims to the Isles of Penance: Orchid Gathering in the East (John Long, London: 1911)
- Islands of Queen Wilhelmina (Constable and Co., London: 1927)
  - Islands of Indonesia (Oxford University Press, Oxford: 1991)
- The Book of Talbot (Faber & Faber, London: 1933) – won the 1933 James Tait Black Prize
- Sanctity: A Play (Sheed & Ward, London: 1934)
- Charister (Hague and Gill, London: 1938)
- Seven Poems (Sheed & Ward, London: 1940)
- Vision of Peru: Kings, Conquerors, Saints (Duckworth, London: 1947)
- Marymas and Other Poems (Kennels Press, Milngavie: 1956)
