= The Tell-Tale Heart (2014 film) =

- Film poster
- Directed by: John La Tier
- Screenplay by: John La Tier
- Story by: Sean Huze; George M. Kostuch; Mark Lowrey; Mikhaela Rosen
- Based on: "The Tell-Tale Heart" by Edgar Allan Poe
- Produced by: Matt Keith; Daniel Zirilli
- Starring: Rose McGowan; Patrick John Flueger; Peter Bogdanovich
- Cinematography: John La Tier
- Edited by: Michael J. Duthie; James Roe
- Music by: Nicholas Rivera
- Release date: February 15, 2014
- Running time: 81 minutes
- Country: United States
- Language: English
- Budget: $1.2 million

The Tell-Tale Heart is a 2014 horror film directed by John La Tier, based on Edgar Allan Poe's 1843 short story of the same name.

== Plot ==
A man is haunted by the heart of a man he murdered. The film moves Poe's story into a contemporary New Orleans setting. Rose McGowan stars as a character who "may or may not be real".

== Cast ==
- Rose McGowan as Ariel
- Patrick John Flueger as Sean
- Peter Bogdanovich as The Old Man
- Jacob Vargas as Adams
- Damon Whitaker as Charlie
- Tony Senzamici as Detective Travis
- Nick Jones Jr. as Military Police #2
- Scott Kodrik as Officer #3
- Evgeny Krutov as Lead Captor (Mark Krutov)
- Robin Hardy as The Apparition

== Development ==
Filming began in October 2011 in New Orleans. The first image from the set was released on October 28, 2011. The first trailer for the film was released on May 10, 2013, and footage from the film was shown at Cannes. It was released in the U.S. in April, 2016, after nearly five years in production. The film was produced by the companies Popart Film Factory & Leverage Entertainment.
