= Frederick Stanley, 16th Earl of Derby =

British politician and Governor General of Canada (1841–1908)

The Right Honourable The Earl of Derby KG GCB GCVO PC
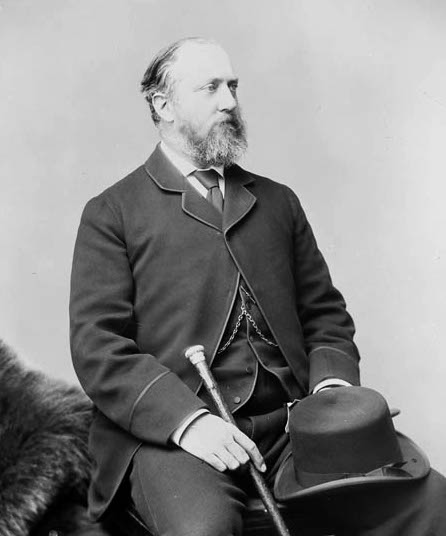
- Stanley in 1889

6th Governor General of Canada
- In office 1 May 1888 – 18 September 1893
- Monarch: Victoria
- Prime Minister: John A. Macdonald; John Abbott; John Thompson
- Preceded by: The Marquess of Lansdowne
- Succeeded by: The Earl of Aberdeen

President of the Board of Trade
- In office 3 August 1886 – 21 February 1888
- Prime Minister: The Marquess of Salisbury
- Preceded by: A. J. Mundella
- Succeeded by: Sir Michael Hicks Beach, Bt

Secretary of State for the Colonies
- In office 24 June 1885 – 28 January 1886
- Prime Minister: The Marquess of Salisbury
- Preceded by: The Earl of Derby
- Succeeded by: The Earl Granville

Secretary of State for War
- In office 2 April 1878 – 21 April 1880
- Prime Minister: The Earl of Beaconsfield
- Preceded by: Gathorne Hardy
- Succeeded by: Hugh Childers

Personal details
- Born: Hon. Frederick Arthur Stanley; 15 January 1841 St James's, Westminster, England
- Died: 14 June 1908 (aged 67) Holwood, Kent, England
- Party: Conservative
- Spouse: Lady Constance Villiers (m. 1864)
- Children: 10, including: Edward Stanley, 17th Earl of Derby; Victor Stanley; Arthur Stanley; George Stanley; Lady Isobel Gathorne-Hardy
- Parents: Edward Smith-Stanley, 14th Earl of Derby; Emma Caroline Bootle-Wilbraham
- Education: Harrow; Royal Military College, Sandhurst

Military service
- Allegiance: United Kingdom
- Branch/service: British Army
- Years of service: 1862–1908
- Rank: Captain; Lieutenant Colonel Commandant; Honorary Colonel
- Unit: Grenadier Guards; 1st Royal Lancashire Militia; 5th Battalion, King's Regiment (Liverpool)

Frederick Arthur Stanley, 16th Earl of Derby (15 January 1841 – 14 June 1908), known as Lord Stanley of Preston from 1886 to 1893, was a British Conservative politician and military officer who served as Colonial Secretary from 1885 to 1886 and Governor General of Canada from 1888 to 1893. An avid sportsman, he built Stanley House Stables in England and presented Canada with the Stanley Cup, the championship trophy in ice hockey. He was also one of the original inductees of the Hockey Hall of Fame.

== Early life and education ==
Stanley was born in St James's Square, Westminster, the second surviving son of Edward Smith-Stanley, Lord Stanley, and the Hon. Emma Caroline, Lady Stanley, daughter of Edward Bootle-Wilbraham, 1st Baron Skelmersdale. He was educated at Harrow and Sandhurst.

In 1851, his father succeeded as 14th Earl of Derby. The longest-serving leader of the Conservative Party (1846–68), the 14th Earl served as Prime Minister on three occasions, from February to December 1852, 1858–1859, and 1866–1868.

== Military career ==
Stanley received a commission in the Grenadier Guards, rising to the rank of Captain before leaving the army for politics. He later served as Lieutenant-Colonel Commandant of the part-time 1st Royal Lancashire Militia (The Duke of Lancaster's Own) from 23 June 1874 (though his political duties often kept him away from the regiment's annual training) and became Honorary Colonel of its successor, the 3rd and 4th Battalions, King's Own (Royal Lancaster Regiment), from 27 February 1886 until his death. He also followed his father and grandfather as Hon Colonel of the 1st Volunteer Battalion, King's (Liverpool Regiment), being appointed on 15 January 1894. After his death he was succeeded in this appointment by his son in turn.

== Political career ==
Stanley served as a Conservative Member of Parliament for Preston (1865–68), North Lancashire (1868–85) and Blackpool (1885–86). In government, he served as a Civil Lord of the Admiralty (1868), Financial Secretary to the War Office (1874–78), Secretary to the Treasury (1878), War Secretary (1878–80) and Colonial Secretary (1885–86). In 1886, he was created Baron Stanley of Preston, in the County Palatine of Lancaster. He served as President of the Board of Trade (1886–88), remaining in that office until he was appointed Governor General of Canada.

Derby was a Freemason.

== Governor General of Canada ==
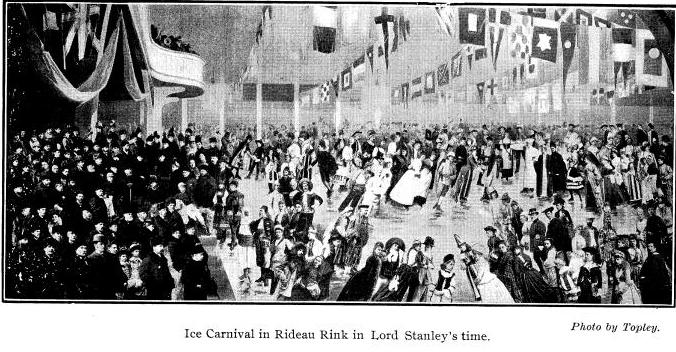
Ice Carnival in Rideau Rink in Lord Stanley's time 1888–1893

Stanley was appointed the Governor General of Canada and Commander in Chief of Prince Edward Island on 1 May 1888. During his term as Governor General, he travelled often and widely throughout the country. His visit to western Canada in 1889 gave him a lasting appreciation of the region's great natural beauty as well as permitting him to meet the people of Canada's First Nations and many western ranchers and farmers. During his visit, he dedicated Stanley Park, which is named after him. He also experienced the joys of fishing and avidly pursued the sport whenever his busy schedule allowed. As governor general, Stanley was the third holder of that office to whom Queen Victoria granted the power of granting pardons to offenders or remitting sentences and fines and the power of mitigating capital or any other sentence.

When Prime Minister John A. Macdonald died in office of heart failure on 6 June 1891, Stanley lost the close friendship he had enjoyed with Macdonald. He asked John Abbott to take over as prime minister. Once the government was in place, Abbott resigned for health reasons and turned the government over to John Thompson. Stanley helped cement the non-political role of the governor general when, in 1891, he refused to agree to a controversial motion in the House of Commons. The motion called on him as governor general to disallow the government of Quebec's Jesuit Estates Act, which authorized paying CA$400,000 as compensation for land granted to the Jesuits by the King of France. The opposition to the bill was introduced by the other provinces who were motivated by mistrust of the Roman Catholic Church in Quebec. Stanley declined to interfere, citing the proposed disallowance as unconstitutional. In holding to this decision, he gained popularity by refusing to compromise the viceregal position of political neutrality.

== Stanley Cup ==
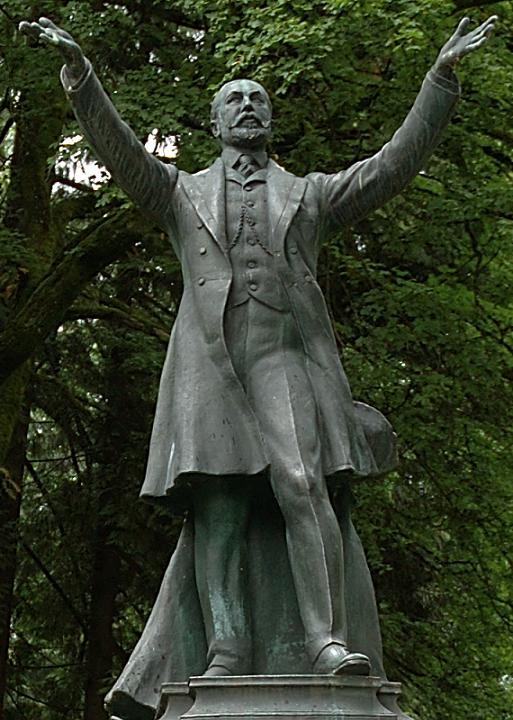
A statue of Lord Stanley stands in Stanley Park, Vancouver.

Stanley's sons became avid ice hockey players in Canada, playing in amateur leagues in Ottawa, and Lord and Lady Stanley became staunch hockey fans. In 1892, Stanley bequeathed to Canada a trophy today named in his honour as the Stanley Cup, known originally as the Dominion Hockey Challenge Cup. He originally donated the trophy as a challenge cup for Canada's best amateur hockey club, but in 1909, it became contested for by professional teams exclusively. Since 1926, only teams of the National Hockey League have competed for the trophy. This now-famous cup bears his name as a tribute to his encouragement and love of outdoor life and sport in Canada and in recognition, he was inducted into the Hockey Hall of Fame in 1945 in the "Honoured Builders" category. The original size of the trophy was 7 inches (180 mm) and is now around 36 inches (910 mm) and weighs 35 pounds (16 kg).

== Later years ==
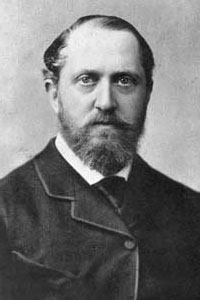
Frederick Arthur Stanley

Stanley's term as Governor General of Canada was due to end in September 1893 but in April of that year, his elder brother, the 15th Earl of Derby, died. Stanley succeeded him as the 16th Earl of Derby. As a result, Stanley, now known as Lord Derby, left Canada on 15 July 1893 and returned to England. An administrator was appointed to fulfil his duties until Lord Aberdeen was sworn in that September.

Also in 1893, Toronto's "New Fort York" (built in 1841) was renamed The Stanley Barracks in honour of Lord Stanley. Back with his family in England, he soon became the Lord Mayor of Liverpool and the first Chancellor of the University of Liverpool. Stanley Park, Liverpool, is also named after him. In November 1901 Lord Derby was elected Mayor of Preston for the following year, and took part in the 1902 Preston Guild. He later received the honorary freedom of the borough of Preston, with which his family had been associated for centuries.

During the last years of his life, he increasingly dedicated himself to philanthropic work. He was founder president of the committee for the building of Liverpool Cathedral in 1901, and helped fund the Coronation Park, Ormskirk, in 1905.

== Marriage and issue ==
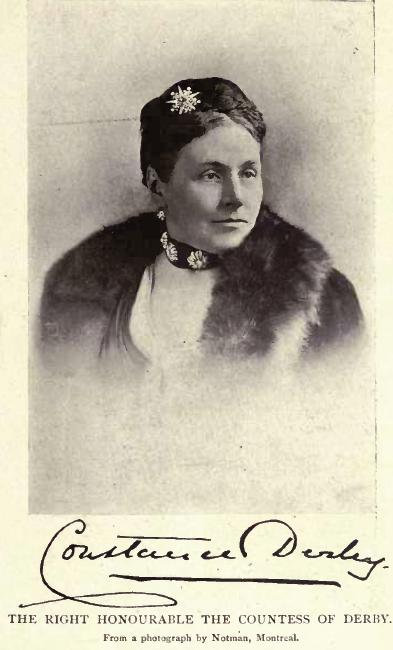
Constance Stanley, Countess of Derby by William Notman

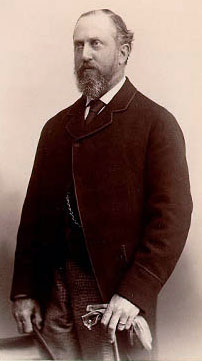
The Earl of Derby

Derby married Lady Constance Villiers, daughter of George Villiers, 4th Earl of Clarendon, on 31 May 1864. She was born in 1840. They had eight sons and two daughters:

- Edward George Villiers Stanley (1865–1948), who succeeded his father as 17th Earl of Derby.
- Hon. Sir Victor Albert Stanley (1867–1934), was an Admiral in the Royal Navy who married a Canadian lady, the daughter of Hon. C. E. Pooley, KC, of British Columbia.
- Katharine Mary Stanley (21 April 1868 – 21 October 1871), died in childhood
- Hon. Sir Arthur Stanley (1869–1947), twin
- Geoffrey Stanley (18 November 1869 – 16 March 1871), twin, died in childhood
- Hon. Ferdinand Charles Stanley (28 January 1871 – 17 March 1935), was educated at Wellington and Sandhurst, before joining the King's Royal Rifle Corps in 1891, rising to the rank of Brigadier-General. He married the Hon. Alexandra Fellowes, the eldest daughter of William Henry Fellowes, Baron de Ramsey; they lived at 8 Cornwall Terrace, Regent's Park, London, now renamed Stanley House.
- Lt.-Col. Rt. Hon. Sir George Frederick Stanley (1872–1938), Royal Horse Artillery, MP, junior minister and Governor of Madras. Married Lady Beatrix Taylour (died 1944), daughter of Thomas Taylour, 3rd Marquess of Headfort; they had a daughter.
- Hon. Col. Algernon Francis Stanley (8 January 1874 – 10 February 1962), married the widow Mary Cavendish Crichton (her late husband Lt-Col. Henry William, son of John Crichton, 4th Earl Erne was KIA in 1914 on the Western Front), daughter of Hugh Grosvenor, 1st Duke of Westminster. They had one son and a daughter.
- Lady Isobel Gathorne-Hardy (1875–1963), who was instrumental in convincing her father to create the Stanley Cup. She is mentioned in one of the first games of women's hockey, played at Rideau Skating Rink in 1899. Her role as a women's hockey pioneer is recognized in women's hockey with both the Isobel Gathorne-Hardy Award, given across women's hockey in Canada, and the Isobel Cup, the Premier Hockey Federation's championship trophy.
- Lt.-Col. Hon. Frederick William Stanley (27 May 1878 – 9 August 1942), married Lady Alexandra Louise Elizabeth Acheson, the daughter of Archibald Acheson, 4th Earl of Gosford, and Louisa Acheson, Countess of Gosford, on 17 June 1905. They had one son and two daughters, one of whom married the son of Lieutenant-General Sir George Sidney Clive. He would go on to serve and be wounded in the Second Boer War, and later the First World War.

Her Ladyship, whom Wilfrid Laurier described as "an able and witty woman", remained and several of their children lived in Canada throughout his term as Governor-General. She founded the Lady Stanley Institute for Trained Nurses on Rideau Street, the first nursing school in Ottawa, as well as a Maternity Hospital. She was also an enthusiastic fan of hockey games at the Rideau Rink. She was president of the $4,000 fund instituted by the women of Canada for the presentation of a wedding gift to the present Prince and Princess of Wales: a sleigh, robes, harnesses and horses and a canoe. In 1890 Prince George of Wales (the future King George V) was their guest at Rideau Hall. In 1903 King Edward VII was their guest at their residence in St James's Square.

Derby died on 14 June 1908, aged 67, and was succeeded by his eldest son, Edward, who also became a distinguished politician. Lady Derby died on 17 April 1922.

== Legacy ==
After Edward Whymper made the first ascent of Stanley Peak in 1901, he named the mountain after Lord Derby. Vancouver's Stanley Park and Stanley Theatre were also named after him, as was Stanley Park, Blackpool.

The Preston Squadron of cadets at the Royal Military College Saint-Jean was named in his honour. Stanley Park, Liverpool, an area that famously separates Anfield and Goodison Park, the home grounds of English Premier League football teams Liverpool F.C. and Everton F.C., was named after him. Stanley House Inn, named for Lord Stanley and was built as his summer residence in 1888 along the Cascapedia River.

The Dominion Hockey Challenge Cup is today known as the Stanley Cup and is awarded to the winning team of the National Hockey League playoffs each season. In October 2017, Lord Stanley's Gift Monument was erected in Ottawa at Sparks Street and Elgin Street, near the location of the dinner party announcing the Cup at the Russell House, which has since been demolished.

Stanley Quay, later renamed Stanley Street, in Brisbane, Australia, was named after him when he was Colonial Secretary.

== In popular culture ==
In Mrs Brown (1997), Lord Stanley was portrayed by actor Jason Morell.

== Honorary degrees ==
- Queen's University in Kingston, Ontario (LL.D) in 1889

== Honorific eponyms ==
- Stanley, New Brunswick
- Stanley, Nova Scotia
- Port Stanley, Ontario
- Stanley (Oliver Paipoonge), Ontario
- Stanley Park, Vancouver, British Columbia
- Stanley Park, Liverpool, UK
- Stanley Peak (Ball Range) (British Columbia)
- Rue Stanley, Montréal, Québec
- Stanley Avenue, Victoria, British Columbia
- Stanley Street, Brisbane, Queensland
- Stanley Street, Townsville, Queensland
- Stanley Glacier, British Columbia
  - Stanleycaris, a fossil genus whose type species was first found there

== Arms ==
Coat of arms of Frederick Stanley, 16th Earl of Derby
Crest On a chapeau gules turned up ermine an eagle, wings extended, or, preying on an infant in its cradle proper, swaddled gules, the cradle laced or. Escutcheon Argent, on a bend azure three stags' heads caboshed or. Supporters Dexter, a griffin, wings elevated; sinister, a stag, each or, and ducally collared with line reflexed over the back azure. Motto Sans changer (Without changing). Orders The Most Noble Order of the Garter (KG).

== See also ==
- List of statues and sculptures in Liverpool
- List of attractions and monuments in Stanley Park

== Notes ==
Parliament of the United Kingdom
Preceded by Sir Thomas Fermor-Hesketh, Bt; Charles Pascoe Grenfell	Member of Parliament for Preston; 1865–1868; With: Sir Thomas Fermor-Hesketh, Bt	Succeeded by Sir Thomas Fermor-Hesketh, Bt; Edward Hermon
Preceded by Marquess of Hartington; John Wilson-Patten	Member of Parliament for North Lancashire; 1868–1885; With: John Wilson-Patten 1868–1874; Thomas Henry Clifton 1874–1880; Randle Joseph Feilden 1880–1885	Constituency abolished
New constituency	Member of Parliament for Blackpool; 1885–1886	Succeeded by Sir Matthew Ridley, Bt
Political offices
Preceded by Henry Campbell-Bannerman	Financial Secretary to the War Office; 1874–1877	Succeeded by Robert Loyd-Lindsay
Preceded by W. H. Smith	Financial Secretary to the Treasury; 1877–1878	Succeeded by Sir Henry Selwin-Ibbetson, Bt
Preceded by Gathorne Hardy	Secretary of State for War; 1878–1880	Succeeded by Hugh Childers
Preceded by The Earl of Derby	Secretary of State for the Colonies; 1885–1886	Succeeded by The Earl Granville
Preceded by A. J. Mundella	President of the Board of Trade; 1886–1888	Succeeded by Sir Michael Hicks-Beach, Bt
Government offices
Preceded by The Marquess of Lansdowne	Governor General of Canada; 1888–1893	Succeeded by The Earl of Aberdeen
Honorary titles
Preceded by The Earl of Sefton	Lord Lieutenant of Lancashire; 1897–1908	Succeeded by The Lord Shuttleworth
Peerage of England
Preceded by Edward Stanley	Earl of Derby; 1893–1908	Succeeded by Edward Stanley
Peerage of the United Kingdom
New creation	Baron Stanley of Preston; 1886–1908	Succeeded by Edward Stanley
Professional and academic associations
Preceded by Francis John Jayne	President of the Historic Society of Lancashire and Cheshire; 1903–08	Succeeded by Edward, 17th Earl of Derby
