= John Wilson-Patten, 1st Baron Winmarleigh =

British politician (1802–92)

The Right Honourable The Lord Winmarleigh PC
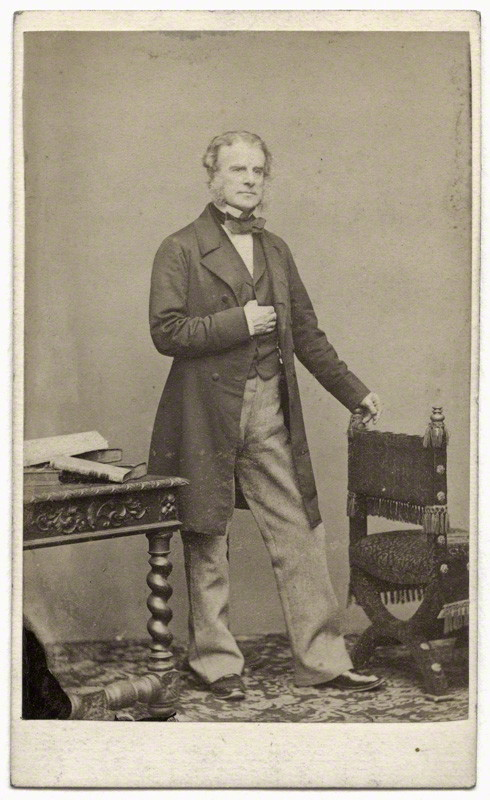

Chancellor of the Duchy of Lancaster
- In office 26 June 1867 – 7 November 1868
- Monarch: Victoria
- Prime Minister: The Earl of Derby; Benjamin Disraeli
- Preceded by: The Earl of Devon
- Succeeded by: Thomas Edward Taylor

Chief Secretary for Ireland
- In office 29 September 1868 – 1 December 1868
- Monarch: Victoria
- Prime Minister: Benjamin Disraeli
- Preceded by: The Earl of Mayo
- Succeeded by: Chichester Parkinson-Fortescue

Personal details
- Born: 26 April 1802
- Died: 11 July 1892 (aged 90)
- Party: Conservative
- Spouse: Anna Maria Patten-Bold
- Education: Magdalen College, Oxford

John Wilson-Patten, 1st Baron Winmarleigh PC (26 April 1802 – 11 July 1892) was a British Conservative politician.

== Background and education ==
Winmarleigh was the second son of Thomas Wilson (formerly Patten) of Warrington, Lancashire, and Elizabeth Hyde, daughter of Nathan Hyde of Ardwick. His father had in 1800 assumed the surname of Wilson in lieu of Patten in accordance with the will of Thomas Wilson (his first cousin twice removed), son of Thomas Wilson, Bishop of Sodor and Man from 1697 to 1755, to whose estates Patten succeeded. However, a few years later the family assumed the surname of Wilson-Patten. He was educated at Eton and Magdalen College, Oxford. While at Oxford, he became friendly with, amongst others, Edward Stanley, later 14th Earl of Derby. He was the president of the Oxford Union.

He was appointed Colonel of the part-time 3rd Royal Lancashire Militia (The Duke of Lancaster's Own) on 15 November 1842. During the Crimean War the regiment was embodied for full-time duty in April 1855 and volunteered for overseas service. Wilson-Patten accompanied his regiment when it sailed from Liverpool to Gibraltar and commanded it during a year's garrison duty there, despite his political duties. He was appointed Honorary Colonel of the regiment on 27 February 1872 after his retirement from command.

He built Winmarleigh Hall in 1871.

== Political career ==
In 1830, Winmarleigh was elected Member of Parliament for Lancashire, but stood down the following year. However, in 1832 he returned to Parliament as representative for the newly created constituency of North Lancashire, a seat he would hold for the next 42 years.

In the House of Commons he became known as a supporter of industrial and labour reform, and took an active part in helping to relieve the Lancashire cotton famine of 1861 to 1865. However, Wilson-Patten did not hold ministerial office until 1867, when, aged 65, he was appointed Chancellor of the Duchy of Lancaster in the last administration of his old friend the Earl of Derby. He was admitted to the Privy Council the same year. He remained in this post until the following year, and then served briefly under Benjamin Disraeli as Chief Secretary for Ireland from September to December 1868. The latter year he also became a member of the Irish Privy Council.

In 1874, on his retirement from the House of Commons, he was raised to the peerage as Baron Winmarleigh, of Winmarleigh in the County Palatine of Lancaster. However, he was seldom active in the House of Lords. He was made Constable of Lancaster Castle in 1879.

== Family ==
In 1828, Wilson-Patten married Anna Maria Patten-Bold, daughter of his paternal uncle Peter Patten-Bold. They had six children, two sons and four daughters. However, Lord Winmarleigh survived both of his two sons, Captain John Wilson-Patten (d. 1873) and Arthur Wilson-Patten (1841-1866), as well as his grandson John Alfred Wilson-Patten (d. 1889), the only son of John. Consequently, on his death at the age of ninety in 1892 the barony became extinct.

== Arms ==
Coat of arms of John Wilson-Patten, 1st Baron Winmarleigh
Crest A griffin's head erased Vert beaked Or. Escutcheon Fusily Ermine and Sable a canton Gules. Supporters Dexter a griffin Vert charged on the shoulder with a lozenge Ermine. Sinister a wolf Or charged on the shoulder with an estoile Sable. Motto To Turn Pale At No Crime

Parliament of the United Kingdom
Preceded by Lord Stanley; John Blackburne	Member of Parliament for Lancashire; 1830–1831; With: Lord Stanley	Succeeded by Lord Stanley; Benjamin Heywood
New constituency	Member of Parliament for North Lancashire; 1832–1874; With: Lord Stanley 1832–1844; John Talbot Clifton 1844–1847; James Heywood 1847–1857; Lord Cavendish of Keighley 1857–1868; Hon. Frederick Stanley 1868–1885	Succeeded by Hon. Frederick Stanley; Thomas Henry Clifton
Political offices
Preceded by The Earl of Devon	Chancellor of the Duchy of Lancaster; 1867–1868	Succeeded by Thomas Edward Taylor
Preceded by The Earl of Mayo	Chief Secretary for Ireland; 1868	Succeeded by Chichester Parkinson-Fortescue
Peerage of the United Kingdom
New creation	Baron Winmarleigh; 1874 – 1892	Extinct
