= The Tell-Tale Heart (1934 film) =

- Opening titles
- Directed by: Brian Desmond Hurst
- Written by: David Plunkett Greene (screenplay), Edgar Allan Poe (short story)
- Based on: The Tell-Tale Heart by Edgar Allan Poe
- Produced by: Harry Clifton
- Starring: Norman Dryden; John Kelt
- Cinematography: Walter Blakeley
- Edited by: Vernon Clancey
- Music by: John Reynders
- Production company: Blattner Studios
- Distributed by: Fox Film Company
- Release date: 14 June 1934
- Running time: 55 minutes
- Country: United Kingdom
- Language: English

The Tell-Tale Heart (U.S. title Bucket of Blood) is a 1934 British drama film directed by Brian Desmond Hurst and starring Norman Dryden, John Kelt and Yolande Terrell. The screenplay by David Plunkett Greene is based on the 1843 short story of the same name by Edgar Allan Poe. It is the earliest known "talkie" film adaptation of the story.

== Plot ==
A young manservant is driven mad by his obsession with the repulsive diseased eye of an old man who cares for him. He kills his master and hides the remains under the floorboards. When the police investigate the old man's disappearance, the imagined beating of the victim's heart haunts the murderer's thoughts so much that his words and actions arouse the suspicions of the police.

== Cast ==
- Norman Dryden as the boy
- John Kelt as the old man
- Yolande Terrell as the girl
- Thomas Shenton as first investigator
- James Fleck as second investigator
- H. Vasher as asylum superintendent
- Colonel Cameron as doctor

== Production ==
Produced by Clifton-Hurst Productions (with Harry Clifton as the listed producer), it was filmed at the Blattner Studios in Elstree. The film was considered so gruesome that it was withdrawn from some cinemas in the UK. The cast was mostly amateur (John Kelt had appeared in several silent films) and the dialogue is so sparse that Hurst recalled when interviewed: "At the big Elstree studios nearby they said 'There's a fellow over at Blattner's studio who's making practically a silent picture.'"

== Reception ==
Kine Weekly wrote: "Here is an extraordinarily interesting, if not commercial, essay in the macabre undertaken by Desmond Hurst, a producer new to this country. The story is taken from one of Edgar Allan Poe's melancholy psychological studies, and is treated with amazing understanding. The cast is a good one with the central character cleverly portraved by Norman Dryden, while the photography admirably retlects the brilliance and subtlety of the director's imagination. ... The mental agonies of the super-sensitive youth, around which the story revolves, are finely suugested through the cleverness of the acting and direction and the brilliance of the camera work. Nothing of the author's psychology is missed in the process of picturisation, and the result is drama of an unusual, gripping and particularly thoughtful character."

The Daily Film Renter wrote: "Adaptation of Edgar Allan Poe's story provides grim study in morbid psychology. Picture that has no popular box-office value, and whose main appeal is to the few specialised halls throughout the country. Excellent camera work creates suspense values, but acting amateurish and dialogue definitely stilted and poor."

Picturegoer wrote: "I am not recommending this picture to any who dislike the macabre and who are likely to be bored by a study in mental psychology but for those who are interested in clever pictorial treatment and excellent camera work, I would say do not miss this ingenious British contribution to screen art. ... It is directed by Desmond Hurst, whose work I do not remember having seen before, but which I shall certainly make a point of seeing again. He has been singularly successful in transferring the psychology of Poe's character to the screen both by his direction of the artistes and by the brillance of the camera work and pictorial expressionism."

== See also ==
- List of horror films of the 1930s
