= The Tell-Tale Heart (1961 film) =

1961 Australian ballet directed by Alan Burke

The Tell-Tale Heart is a 1961 Australian ballet based on the short story The Tell-Tale Heart by Edgar Allan Poe. It screened on the ABC and was directed by Alan Burke. It aired 25 January 1962 in Melbourne.

It was choreographed by Ruth Galene who also starred as the principal dancer.

== Plot ==
A woman is so tormented by the eyes of an old man that she kills him.

== Cast ==
- Colin Croft as the old man
- Ruth Galene as the woman

== Production ==
It was made by the ABC who said they have "gone all out for horror" on the production. In one sequence an enormous eye appeared on screen and the pupil of the eye reflected the slow moving figure of the old man. The music was an original score by composer Nigel Butterley.
