= John Talbot Clifton =

English landowner and traveller (1868–1928)

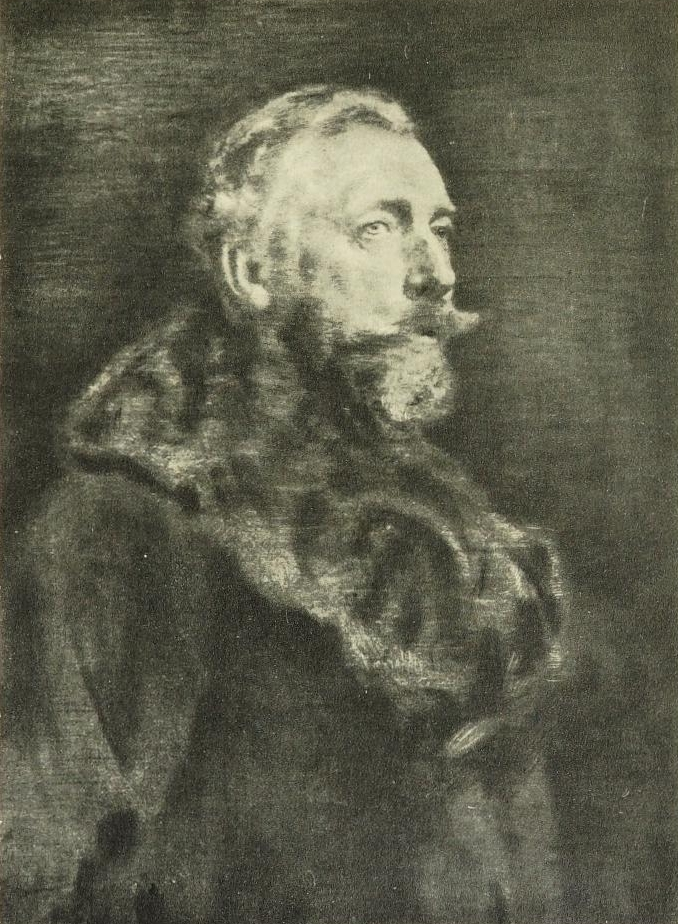

John Talbot Clifton (1 December 1868 – 23 March 1928), known as Talbot Clifton, was an English landowner and traveller.

He was born the son of Thomas Henry Clifton of Lytham Hall, Lancashire and his wife Madeline Agnew and was educated at Eton College and Magdalene College, Cambridge. He succeeded his grandfather, John Talbot Clifton (1819–1882), who had been MP for Lancashire and High Sheriff of Lancashire for 1853, as owner of the Lytham estate at the age of 14.

He became a compulsive traveller who explored Canada, Siberia, Burma, Malaya, Indonesia, Africa and South America, and was known for shooting wild animals and eating them. Some of the animals he shot were species new to science and were named after him, such as a type of wild Siberian sheep (Clifton's bighorn) and a Canadian marmot. He once dined on mammoth recovered frozen from the Arctic permafrost.

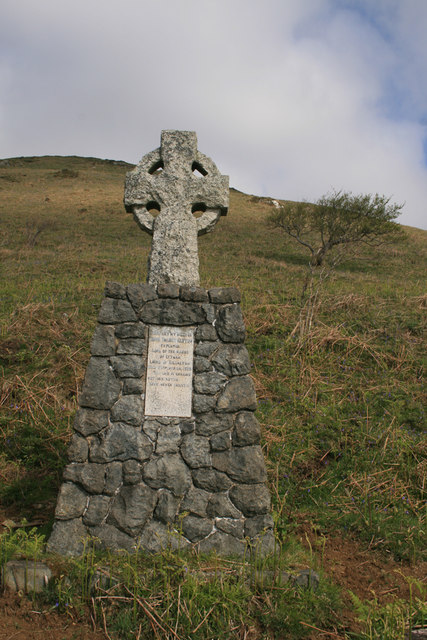
John Talbot Clifton's grave at Cnoc Rhoanastil, Islay

He married Violet Mary, the daughter of William Nelthorpe Beauclerk and granddaughter of the William Beauclerk, 8th Duke of St Albans on 1 February 1907 at Brompton Oratory. They had met in Peru, where she was also travelling. They lived at Lytham Hall and had two sons and three daughters. Talbot served as a Justice of the Peace for Lancashire.

After the First World War, during which Talbot had volunteered as a dispatch driver, the couple bought Kylemore House in Connemara, Ireland. There he shot and injured a member of the IRA in an argument over the requisition of his car. In 1922 they bought and moved to live at Kildalton Castle on the Scottish island of Islay in the Inner Hebrides where his passion for shooting wildlife continued unabated.

After several more foreign expeditions he set off on a final journey to Timbuktu with his wife, but fell ill en route. They turned back in Mali but in 1928 he died in the Canary Islands on the way home. Violet had his body embalmed and took it back to Scotland for burial at Cnoc Rhaonastil. She later wrote a biography of her husband, published under the title The Book of Talbot, which won the 1933 James Tait Black Prize.
