= North Lancashire =

North Lancashire may refer to:

- North Lancashire (constituency), a UK parliament constituency from 1832 to 1885
- North Lancashire (unitary authority area), local authority to be created on 1 April 2028
- The northern part of the county of Lancashire, England

== Sports ==
- North Lancashire and Cumbria League, founded 1892, cricket league
- Lancashire (North), from 1987 to 2017, Rugby Union league
- North Lancashire 2, from 1987 to 2015, Rugby Union league
- North Lancashire/Cumbria, from 1987 to 1015, Rugby Union league

== See also ==
- Loyal Regiment (North Lancashire), formerly Loyal North Lancashire Regiment, British Army unit
