= Lathom South =

Civil parish in Lancashire, England

Coordinates: 53.555491°N 2.828765°W

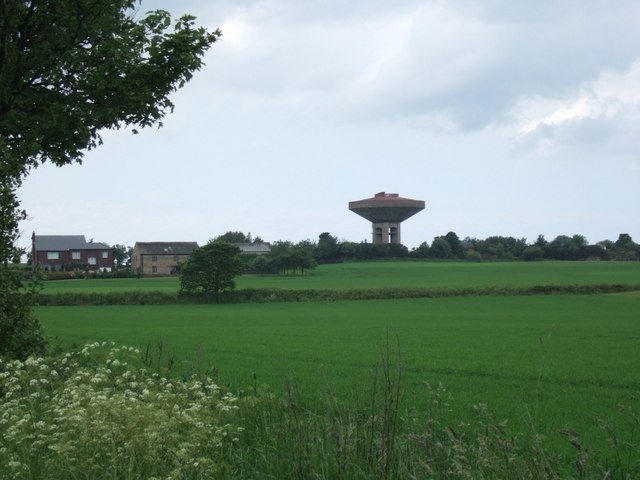
- Water tower at Scarth Hill in background

- Location in West Lancashire Location within Lancashire
- Area: 4.48 km^{2} (1.73 sq mi)
- Population: 657 (2011 Census)
  - Density: 147/km^{2} (380/sq mi)
- OS grid reference: SD451068
- District: West Lancashire
- Shire county: Lancashire
- Region: North West
- Country: England
- Sovereign state: United Kingdom
- Post town: Ormskirk
- Postcode district: L40
- Post town: Skelmersdale, Wigan
- Postcode district: WN8
- Dialling code: 01695
- Police: Lancashire
- Fire: Lancashire
- Ambulance: North West
- UK Parliament: West Lancashire

Lathom South is a civil parish in the West Lancashire district of Lancashire, England, situated near the towns of Ormskirk and Skelmersdale. The parish council was established in 2007, and the area, which includes the hamlets of Blaguegate and Scarth Hill, has historical ties to the neighbouring parish of Lathom. As of 2011, Lathom South has a population of 657.

== History ==
The whole of Lathom was formerly part of Lathom and Burscough Urban District, which in 1931 was merged into Ormskirk Urban District. In 1974, under the Local Government Act 1972, it was subsumed into the newly created district of West Lancashire, and the area now covered by Lathom South became part of the Derby Ward of Ormskirk. On 31 March 2003, a public meeting was held by local residents to discuss the need for local representation, and a working group was set up to consider the available options. At a second meeting held on 1 July 2003, it was agreed to petition for the formation of a parish council. Lathom South Parish Council was established in May 2007.

== Geography ==
Lathom South sits directly between the towns of Ormskirk and Skelmersdale, with the civil parishes of Lathom and Newburgh to the north and northeast, and Bickerstaffe to the south. The northeastern boundary with Newburgh is formed by the River Tawd. The hamlets of Blaguegate and Scarth Hill are located within Lathom South.

== Demography ==
According to the United Kingdom Census 2011, Lathom South parish had a population of 657 people living in 281 households, with a roughly even distribution between males and females. The parish covers an area of 448 hectares (1.73 sq mi; 4.48 km^{2}), giving a population density of 1.47 inhabitants per hectare (380/sq mi; 147/km^{2}). The decrease in population from 687 in 2001 represents a decline of 4.6% over ten years.

A majority of 97% of residents were born in the United Kingdom, and 96.8% identified as being of "White British" ethnicity. Religion was recorded as 81.1% Christian, with 12.9% of residents being of no religion, and 4.1% declining to state; only 1.8% belonged to an alternative religion. Of the 498 residents aged between 16 and 74, 72.7% were regarded as economically active, and of those 3.3% were unemployed.

== Transport ==
Lathom South is bisected by the A577 road, which runs southeast through the parish from Ormskirk to Skelmersdale for a distance of approximately 1.3 miles (2.1 km). The B5240 road also passes through the parish, running from north to south between Lathom and Bickerstaffe. The nearest motorway link is junction 3 of the M58, about 0.7 miles (1.1 km) to the south. Ormskirk railway station is located about 1.2 miles (1.9 km) to the northwest and provides services to Liverpool and Preston.

== See also ==
- Listed buildings in Lathom South
