= Edward Bootle-Wilbraham, 1st Earl of Lathom =

British politician (1837-1898)

The Right Honourable The Earl of Lathom GCB PC
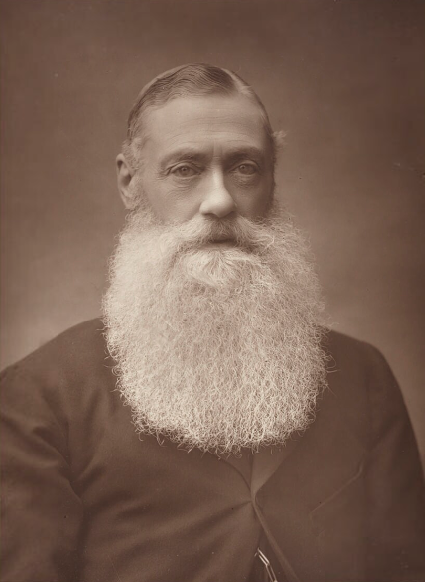
- Bootle-Wilbraham in 1890

Lord Chamberlain of the Household
- In office 27 June 1885 – 28 January 1886
- Monarch: Queen Victoria
- Prime Minister: The Marquess of Salisbury
- Preceded by: The Earl of Kenmare
- Succeeded by: The Earl of Kenmare
- In office 5 August 1886 – 11 August 1892
- Monarch: Queen Victoria
- Prime Minister: The Marquess of Salisbury
- Preceded by: The Earl of Kenmare
- Succeeded by: The Lord Carrington
- In office 16 July 1895 – 19 November 1898
- Monarch: Queen Victoria
- Prime Minister: The Marquess of Salisbury
- Preceded by: The Lord Carrington
- Succeeded by: The Earl of Hopetoun

Personal details
- Born: 12 December 1837 Lathom, England, British Empire
- Died: 19 November 1898 (aged 60)
- Party: Conservative
- Spouse(s): Lady Alice Villiers (1841–1897)
- Children: 5 daughters, Edward and 3 other sons
- Parent: Richard Bootle-Wilbraham
- Education: Christ Church, Oxford

Edward Bootle-Wilbraham, 1st Earl of Lathom GCB PC (12 December 1837 – 19 November 1898), known as the Lord Skelmersdale between 1853 and 1880, was a British Conservative politician. He was a member of every Conservative administration between 1866 and 1898, and notably served three times as Lord Chamberlain of the Household under Lord Salisbury. Having succeeded his grandfather as Baron Skelmersdale in 1853, he was created Earl of Lathom in 1880.

== Early life ==
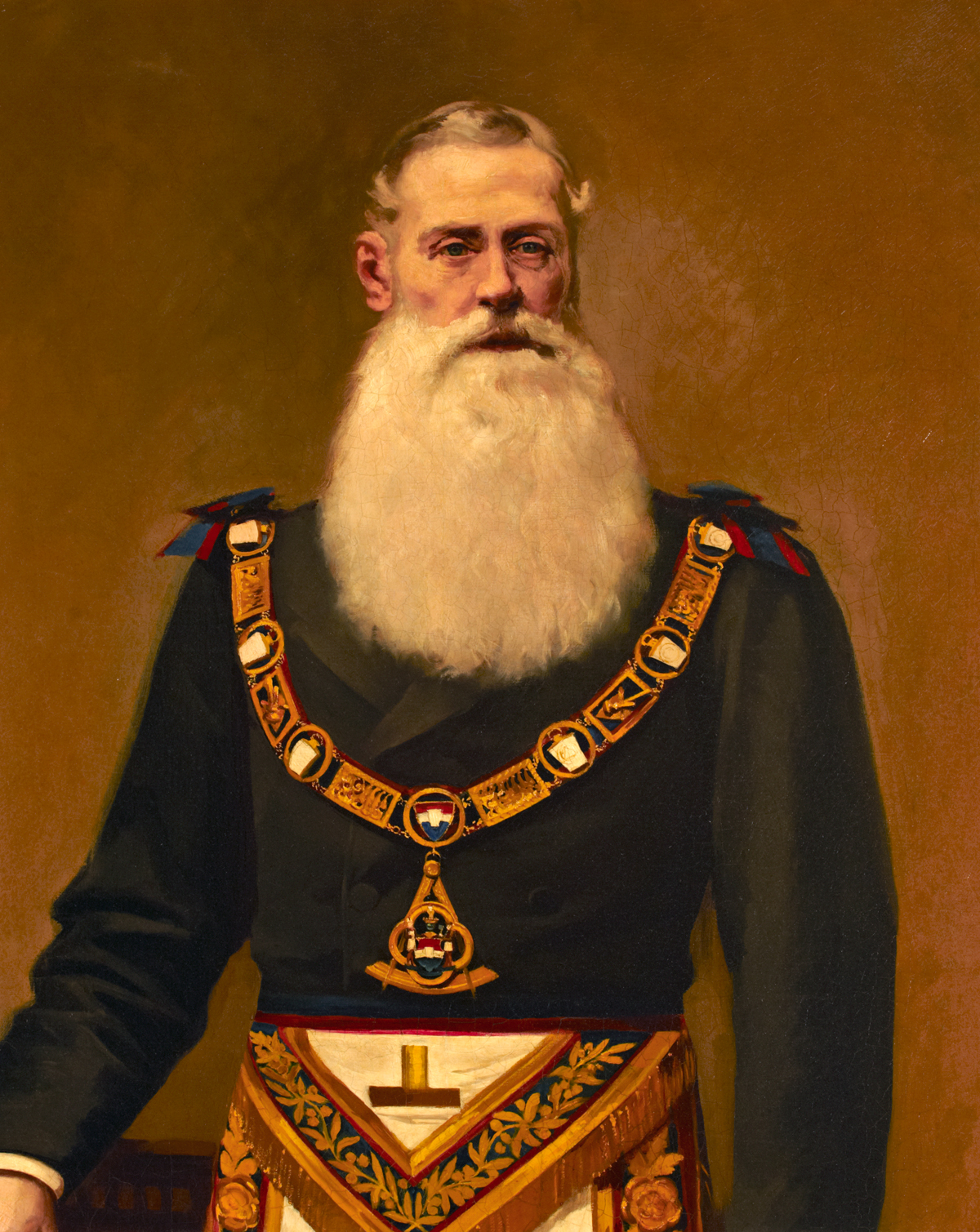
Portrait of Lord Lathom wearing Masonic regalia, by Jean Marius Rogier.

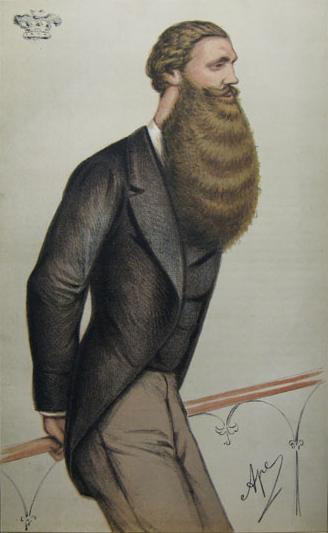
Lord Skelmersdale caricatured in Vanity Fair magazine, 1871.

Bootle-Wilbraham was born at Blythe Hall, Lathom, Lancashire, the son of Hon. Richard Bootle-Wilbraham, MP, eldest son of Edward Bootle-Wilbraham. His mother was Jessy, daughter of Sir Richard Brooke, 6th Baronet of Norton. His father died when Edward was only 7 years old and he was brought up by his grandparents at nearby Lathom House.

He was educated at Eton and Christ Church, Oxford. Whilst a student at Oxford he was initiated into the Apollo University Lodge No 357, and became an active Freemason. He was appointed Honorary Colonel of the 11th (1st Preston) Lancashire Rifle Volunteer Corps on 9 November 1872.

== Career ==
Bootle-Wilbraham succeeded his grandfather as second Baron Skelmersdale in 1853 and was entitled to take a seat in the House of Lords on his 21st birthday in 1858. He served under the Earl of Derby and then Benjamin Disraeli as a Lord-in-waiting from 1866 to 1868. In 1870, he became Conservative Chief Whip in the House of Lords. He once again held office under Disraeli as Captain of the Yeomen of the Guard from 1874 to 1880, and was admitted to the Privy Council in 1874.

In 1880, he was created Earl of Lathom, in the County Palatine of Lancaster. Lord Lathom later held office under Lord Salisbury as Lord Chamberlain of the Household from 1885 to 1886, from 1886 to 1892, and from 1895 to 1898. In 1892, he was appointed a Knight Grand Cross of the Order of the Bath.

== Personal life ==
On 16 August 1860, Lord Lathom married Lady Alice Villiers, daughter of George Villiers and the former Lady Katharine Barham (widow of John Joseph Barham, and eldest daughter of James Grimston). Together, they were the parents of:

- Lady Alice Maud Bootle-Wilbraham, O.B.E. born 1861
- Constance Adela born 16 July 1862 Died 10 Nov 1864 Lathom House
- Lady Florence Mary Bootle-Wilbraham born 1863 died 1944, married the Right Reverend Lord William Cecil, Bishop of Exeter, son of Robert Gascoyne-Cecil, 3rd Marquess of Salisbury, and had issue.
- Edward George Bootle-Wilbraham, 2nd Earl of Lathom (1864–1910), married 1889 Lady Wilma Pleydell-Bouverie, daughter of William Pleydell-Bouverie, 5th Earl of Radnor.
- Lady Bertha Mabel Bootle-Wilbraham, born 1867 married 1903 to Maj. Arthur Frederick Dawkins, Great grandson of Sir Henry Clinton, and a great great grandson of Henry Dawkins the brother of James and also Charles Colyear, 2nd Earl of Portmore. They had one daughter, Edith.
- Hon. Villiers Richard Bootle-Wilbraham, born abt. 1867, married 1900 to Violet Inez de Romero.
- Randle Arthur Brooke Bootle-Wilbraham born 1868 Royal Navy Died 1899, Orme, France
- Lady Edith Cecil. Bootle-Wilbraham.bap Jan 1870. Died 1899.
- Hon. Reginald Francis Bootle-Wilbraham, born abt. 1875, married 1903 to Lilian Mary Holt, daughter of Major William Lyster Holt

The Countess of Lathom died in a carriage accident in November 1897, aged 56. Lady Alice's Drive, opposite Blythe Hall, is named after her. Lord Lathom survived her by a year and died in November 1898, aged 60. He was succeeded in his titles by his eldest son, Edward, Lord Skelmersdale.

Party political offices
Preceded by The Lord Colville of Culross	Conservative Chief Whip in the House of Lords c. 1870 – 1885	Succeeded by The Earl of Kintore
Political offices
Preceded by The Duke of St Albans	Captain of the Yeomen of the Guard; 1874–1880	Succeeded by The Lord Monson
Preceded by The Earl of Bessborough	Government Chief Whip in the House of Lords; 1874–1880	Succeeded by The Lord Monson
Preceded by The Earl of Kenmare	Lord Chamberlain of the Household; 1885–1886	Succeeded by The Earl of Kenmare
Preceded by The Earl of Kenmare	Lord Chamberlain of the Household; 1886–1892	Succeeded by The Lord Carrington
Preceded by The Lord Carrington	Lord Chamberlain of the Household; 1895–1898	Succeeded by The Earl of Hopetoun
Masonic offices
Preceded by The Earl of Carnavon	Pro Grand Master of the United Grand Lodge of England; 1890–1898	Succeeded by The Earl Amherst
Peerage of the United Kingdom
New creation	Earl of Lathom; 1880–1898	Succeeded by Edward Bootle-Wilbraham
Preceded by Edward Bootle-Wilbraham	Baron Skelmersdale; 1853–1898	Succeeded by Edward Bootle-Wilbraham
