= Edward Bootle-Wilbraham, 2nd Earl of Lathom =

British army officer & peer (1864-1910)

The Right Honourable The Earl of Lathom JP KStJ

Personal details
- Born: Edward George Bootle-Wilbraham; 25 October 1864
- Died: 15 March 1910 (aged 45)
- Spouse: Lady Wilma Pleydell-Bouverie (m. 1889)
- Relations: Richard Bootle-Wilbraham (grandfather); George Villiers, 4th Earl of Clarendon (grandfather)
- Children: 5
- Parent(s): Edward Bootle-Wilbraham, 1st Earl of Lathom; Lady Alice Villiers
- Education: Eton College

Edward George Bootle-Wilbraham, 2nd Earl of Lathom JP KStJ (25 October 1864 – 15 March 1910), was an English Army officer and peer.

== Early life ==
He was the eldest son of Edward Bootle-Wilbraham, 1st Earl of Lathom and the former Lady Alice Villiers. Among his siblings were Villiers Richard Bootle-Wilbraham (who married Violet Inez de Romero), Lady Bertha Mabel Bootle-Wilbraham (wife of Maj. Arthur Frederick Dawkins), and Lady Florence Mary Bootle-Wilbraham (wife of the Rt. Rev. Lord William Cecil, Bishop of Exeter, son of Robert Gascoyne-Cecil, 3rd Marquess of Salisbury).

His paternal grandparents were the Hon. Richard Bootle-Wilbraham, MP (eldest son of Edward Bootle-Wilbraham, 1st Baron Skelmersdale of Lathom House) and the former Jessy Brooke (a daughter of Sir Richard Brooke, 6th Baronet of Norton Priory). His maternal grandparents were George Villiers, 4th Earl of Clarendon and the former Lady Katharine Barham (widow of John Joseph Barham, and eldest daughter of James Grimston, 1st Earl of Verulam). He was educated at Eton College.

== Career ==
He gained the rank of Commander in the Royal Navy Volunteer Reserve, Liverpool Division. He was a Major in the Royal Horse Guards from 1896 to 1897, and a Major and Hon. Lieutenant-Colonel in the Lancashire Hussars. He held the office of Justice of the Peace for Lancashire. In 1889, he unsuccessfully contested the seat for South Lancashire previously held by his grandfather. Upon the death of his father on 19 November 1898, he succeeded as the 2nd Earl of Lathom, and the 3rd Baron Skelmersdale.

== Personal life ==
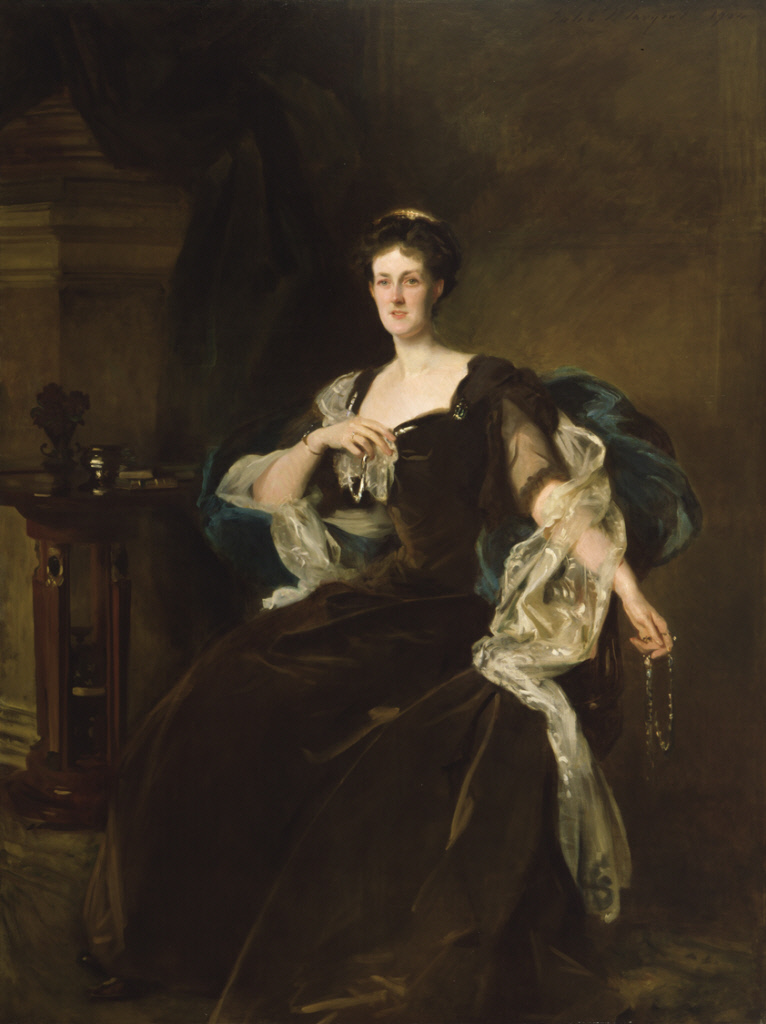
Portrait of his wife, Wilma, Countess of Lathom, by John Singer Sargent, 1904

On 15 August 1889, Lord Lathom married Lady Wilma Pleydell-Bouverie, the only surviving daughter of William Pleydell-Bouverie, 5th Earl of Radnor and Helen Matilda Chaplin (only surviving daughter of Rev. Henry Chaplin, Vicar of Ryhall and sister of Henry Chaplin, 1st Viscount Chaplin). Together, they were the parents of:

- Lady Helen Alice Bootle-Wilbraham (1890–1929), who married Hugh Sartorius Whitaker, son of William Ingham Whitaker, in 1913. They divorced in 1922 and she married Maj.-Gen. Henry William Newcome, in 1925.
- Lady Barbara Ann Bootle-Wilbraham (1893–1949), who married Lt. Francis Seymour, son of Hugh Francis Seymour, in 1914.
- Edward William Bootle-Wilbraham, 3rd Earl of Lathom (1895–1930), who married Marie Xenia (née de Tunzelman) Morrisson, daughter of E. W. de Tunzelman and the former wife of Ronald William Morrison, in 1927.
- Lady Rosemary Wilma Bootle-Wilbraham (1903–1968), who married Vincent Francis Cassidy in 1930. After his death she married Capt. T. H. Bird.

Lord Lathom died on 15 March 1910. Lady Lathom remarried on 16 November 1912 to Lt.-Gen. Sir Henry Merrick Lawson.

Peerage of the United Kingdom
Preceded by Edward Bootle-Wilbraham	Earl of Lathom; 1898–1910	Succeeded by Edward Bootle-Wilbraham
