= Blythe Hall, Lathom =

Blythe Hall
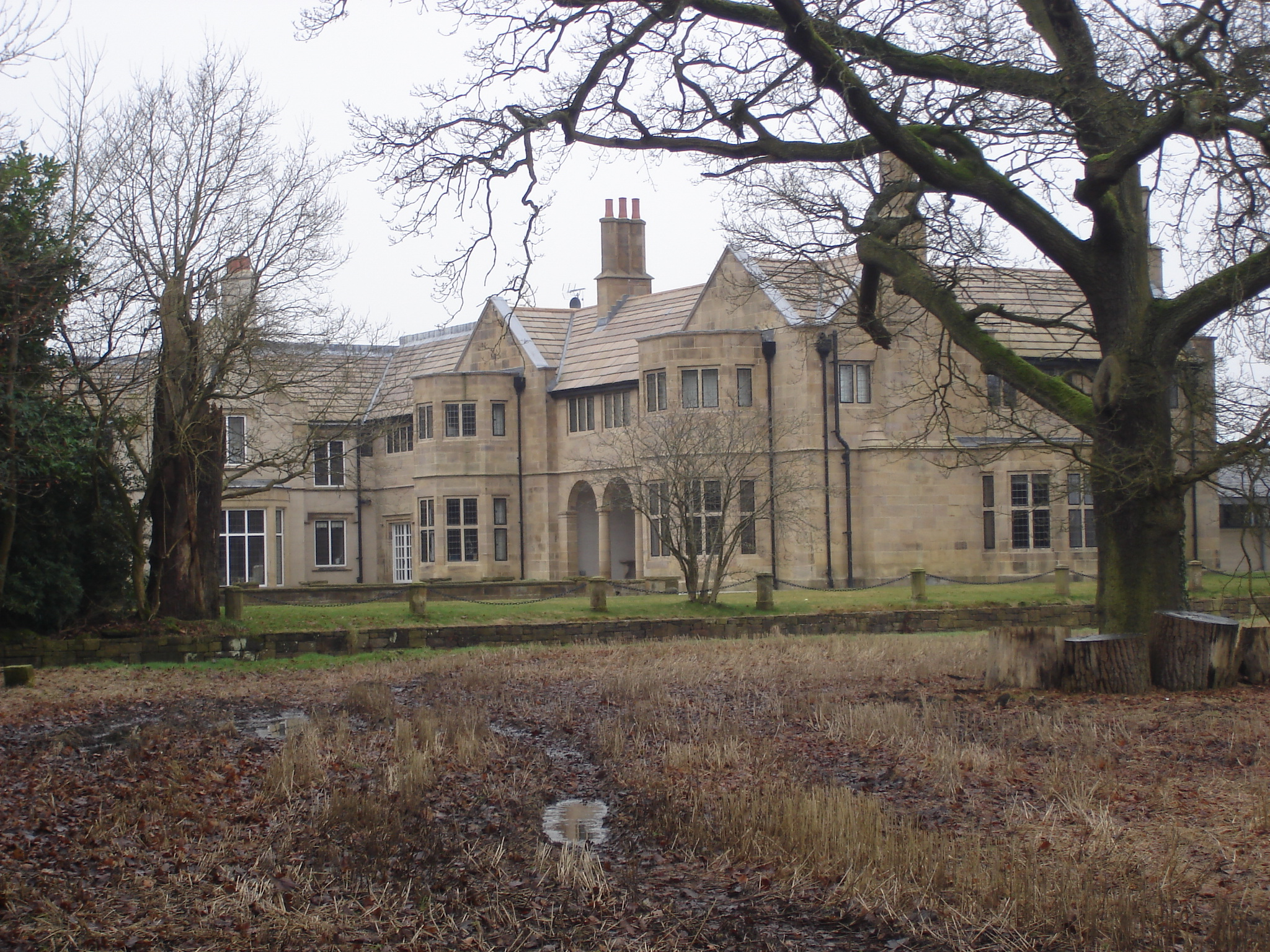

- Location within the Borough of West Lancashire

General information
- Type: Country house
- Location: Lathom, Lancashire, England
- Coordinates: 53.5835°N 2.8496°W

Technical details
- Material: Rendered sandstone rubble
- Floor count: 2

Listed Building – Grade II
- Designated: 11 August 1972
- Reference no.: 1297543

Blythe Hall is a large grade II listed country house in Lathom, Lancashire, England, some 3 miles (5 km) north-east of Ormskirk.

It is a two-storey building of rendered sandstone rubble with stone slate roofs to an originally H-shaped plan with added wings.

== History ==
Blythe Hall was probably built in the late 16th century or early 17th century and altered in early 19th century.

The hall was once the property of Evan Blackledge, who died in 1612, after which it passed through several generations of the Blackledge family. It was sold to the Hill family of Burscough in 1698 and then to Thomas Langton in 1800, who never moved in but instead leased it to Edward Clifton. In 1826 it was sold to Edward Bootle-Wilbraham, 1st Baron Skelmersdale. whose eldest son and his wife Jessy lived there. Edward Bootle-Wilbraham, 1st Earl of Lathom was born in the house in 1837 and his sister, Rose Bootle-Wilbraham, was born there in 1842. Lady Alice's Drive, opposite Blythe Hall, is named after Lady Alice Villiers, wife of the first Earl. Lady Skelmersdale died there in 1892, leaving it in the possession of Rose, who never married and died in 1918.

It was radically altered and enlarged c.1918–21, at a cost of £60,000, by Edward Bootle-Wilbraham, 3rd Earl of Lathom (1895–1930), who was reluctant to restore and re-occupy the family seat at Lathom House after the First World War. Many of the materials used at Blythe Hall were salvaged from Lathom Hall. The third earl was a spendthrift with a passion for the London theatre and in the 1920s Blythe entertained theatrical celebrities such as Ivor Novello and Noël Coward. The house was advertised, along with the rest of the Lathom estates, in 1923, and was sold to a cotton merchant named Taylor. After the Earl's early death from tuberculosis in 1930, the earldom was extinguished.

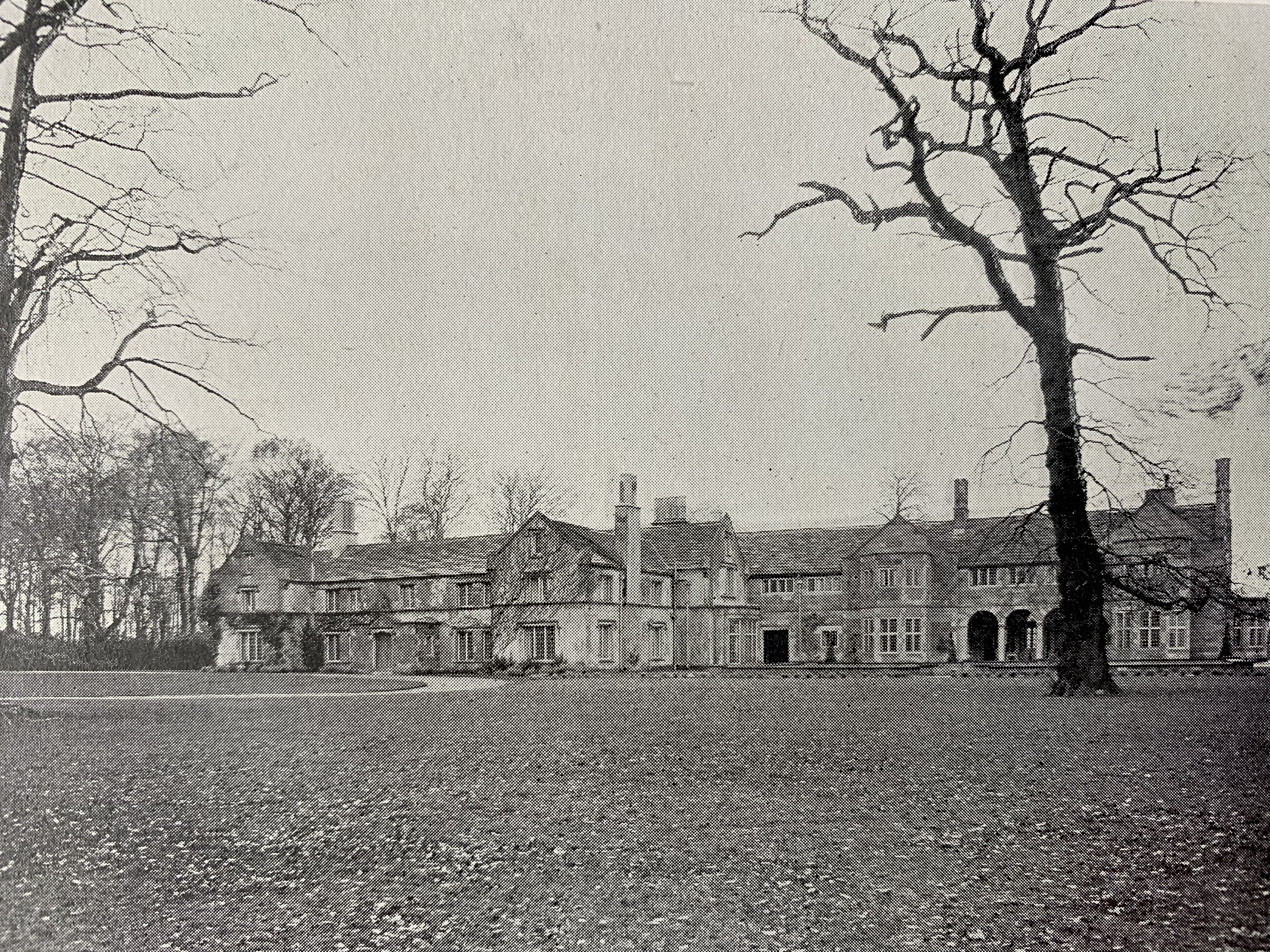
Blythe Hall as shown in sale advert in December 1923

In 1933 it became a Catholic Seminary for training Passionist priests and called St Gabriel's Retreat. In 1973 it was bought by ex-footballer David Whelan for £80,000 and in 1980 by hoteliers John and Diana Craig.

It was reduced in size in c.1975 by demolition of the oldest parts. In 2010 it is undergoing a further makeover by new owners Andy and Tracey Bell from Rufford.

== See also ==
- Listed buildings in Lathom
