= Listed buildings in Bickerstaffe =

Bickerstaffe is a civil parish in the West Lancashire district of Lancashire, England. It contains twelve listed buildings that are recorded in the National Heritage List for England. All of the listed buildings are designated at Grade II, the lowest of the three grades, which is applied to "buildings of national importance and special interest". The parish contains the village of Bickerstaffe and the hamlet of Barrow Nook, and is otherwise rural. The listed buildings include houses, farmhouses and farm buildings, a church, structures associated with the Friends' Burial Ground, a converted windmill, a boundary stone, stocks, and a war memorial.

== Buildings ==
Name and location	Photograph	Date	Notes
Tithe Barn Farmhouse; 53.53648°N 2.84941°W	—	1723	A pebbledashed brick house with a stone-slate roof in two storeys and two bays. The central doorway has a gabled porch, and the windows have segmental heads. Above the door is a small tablet with a shield of arms, and to the right of it is an inscribed plaque.
Bickerstaffe Stocks; 53.54098°N 2.84171°W	—	1750 or earlier	The stocks consist of two rectangular round-headed sandstone pillars. They are about 1 metre (3 ft 3 in) high with slots on the inner sides, and contain modern planks with two ankle holes.
Bickerstaffe Hall; 53.53029°N 2.84042°W	—	1772	A brick house on a stone plinth with some stone dressings and a slate roof. It has two storeys with an attic, and a front of three bays. The windows are sashes that have stone sills and rusticated lintels with keystones. The doorway has a moulded surround and a timber lean-to porch. Above the plinth is a re-set inscribed plaque dated 1667, and above the doorway is a plaque carved with an eagle and a child. On the roof is a cupola bellcote. The moated site on which the hall stands is a scheduled monument.
Eastern barn and engine house, Bickerstaffe Hall Farm; 53.53011°N 2.83951°W	—	Late 18th century	The building was extended to the right in the 19th century with a taller addition. It is in brick, and has a roof partly of slate and partly of stone-slate. The openings include a cart entrance with a canopy, doorways, windows, and pitching holes. At the rear is a projecting wing with external steps.
South-western barn, Bickerstaffe Hall Farm; 53.52974°N 2.83963°W	—	Late 18th century	The barn is in brick, and has a roof partly of slate and partly of stone-slate. The openings include cart entrances with segmental arches, windows, a pitching hole, ventilation slits, and three low arched entrances. Above one of the cart entrances is the coat of arms of the Earl of Derby.
Old Windmill; 53.53667°N 2.84378°W		Late 18th century (probable)	The windmill has been converted for domestic use. It is in rendered brick with a conical roof, and has a circular plan. There are three storeys, and the windows date from the 20th century. There is a doorway on the north side, and later extensions to the east.
Mounting block 53.53469°N 2.87501°W	—	c. 1800	The mounting block is in the Friends' Burial Ground. It is in sandstone, and consists of three steps, each from a separate block of stone.
Gateway and farm buildings, Bickerstaffe Hall Farm; 53.53021°N 2.83993°W	—	Early 19th century	The farm buildings are in brick with a slate roof. The main part is symmetrical with two storeys and three bays and a central gable. There are horizontal sliding sash windows in the upper floor, and in the ground floor are three elliptical arches, the central one being larger and forming a gateway. The main part is flanked by single-storey ranges, and at the rear is an animal pen.
Holy Trinity Church; 53.53200°N 2.83808°W		1843	The church, designed by Sydney Smirke, was enlarged in 1860. It is in sandstone with slate roofs, and consists of a nave, a north aisle, a chancel with a polygonal apse, a north vestry, and a west steeple. The steeple has a tower with angle buttresses, corner pinnacles, and with flying buttresses to the spire. Inside the church is a west gallery.
Boundary stone 53.54712°N 2.87879°W	—	Mid 19th century	The boundary stone is in sandstone and is cylindrical. It is inscribed 'Aughton' and 'Bickerstaffe' on the top, and "Boundary stone" on the front.
Wall, gate and gate piers 53.53496°N 2.87478°W	—	1880 and earlier	The walls, which enclose three sides of the Friends' Burial Ground, and the gate piers are in sandstone. The gate piers have a square plan, cornices and pyramidal caps. The gates are in wrought iron.
War memorial 53.53190°N 2.83834°W		c. 1920	The war memorial is in the churchyard of Holy Trinity Church. It is in limestone and in Gothic style. The memorial has a square base with square chamfered corner piers standing on three square steps. The body of the memorial has slim diagonal buttresses with crocketed pinnacles, and on the top is a crocketed shaft and an inscribed cross fleury.
