= Listed buildings in Lathom =

Lathom is a civil parish in the West Lancashire district of Lancashire, England. It contains 49 buildings that are recorded in the National Heritage List for England as designated listed buildings. Of these, one is at Grade II*, the middle grade, and the others are at Grade II, the lowest grade. The parish contains the village of Lathom, and is otherwise rural. The most important building in the parish is Lathom House, but most of this has been demolished, leaving only part of one wing. This is listed, together with structures associated with it. The Leeds and Liverpool Canal and its Rufford branch run through the parish, and the associated listed structures include culverts, locks and bridges. There are also three former railway level crossing keeper's cottages built for the Manchester and Southport Railway. Because of its rural nature, many of the listed buildings are farmhouses and farm buildings. The other listed buildings include a chapel, almshouses, other bridges, houses and associated structures, lodges, a war memorial, and a school.

== Key ==
Grade	Criteria
II*	Particularly important buildings of more than special interest
II	Buildings of national importance and special interest

== Buildings ==
Name and location	Photograph	Date	Notes	Grade
Lathom House Chapel of St John; 53.57824°N 2.82170°W		c. 1500	The chapel was built by the 2nd Earl of Derby, and is in sandstone, partly rendered, with a stone-slate roof. It consists of a nave and chancel in a single unit, and an east porch. On the east side are three segmental-arched windows, and on the north gable is an octagonal bellcote. The south gable contains a large five-light window with Perpendicular tracery. Inside the chapel, some of the fittings and furniture were formerly in Burscough Priory.	II
Blythe Hall; 53.58349°N 2.84959°W		Early 17th century (probable)	The oldest part of the hall is in stuccoed sandstone with a green slate roof. It has an H-shaped plan, it is in two storeys with attics, and has mulliond windows. In about 1920 the house was remodelled, and was extended at the rear by the addition of a five-bay wing in sandstone with a stone-slate roof. The interior of the original part was altered to make an open hall with a two-storey Ionic screen. The extension includes a swimming pool in Greek Doric style, with a coffered ceiling and semi-fluted, semi-mosaic columns.	II
Cranes Hall; 53.57576°N 2.82951°W	—	17th century	A house that has been repeatedly expanded. It is in roughcast on stone and probably some brick, it has stone-slate roofs, and is in two storeys. The 17th-century part is at the rear, the main part has three bays, with two single-bay extensions to the right. On the front is a canted stone porch with three steps leading up to a doorway with a fanlight and a moulded cornice. There are French windows in the two later bays, and the other windows are sashes.	II
Lathom House Almshouses; 53.57846°N 2.82194°W		17th century (probable)	The eleven almshouses are in an L-shaped plan and are attached to the Chapel of St John. They are in sandstone, partly rendered, and have composition tile roofs. The almshouses are in a single storey with attics. The doorways have square heads and hood moulds, and the windows are 20th-centgury casements set in blank round-headed arches. At the rear there are dormer windows and 20th-century extensions.	II
Bird i'th' Hand Farmhouse; 53.59440°N 2.81306°W	—	17th century (probable)	A sandstone house with a stone-slate roof, in two storeys and two bays. It was extended in the 19th century with the addition of a one-bay wing to the rear. The doorway is to the left, it has a thin lintel, and there are two casement windows on each floor.	II
Taylor's Farmhouse; 53.58907°N 2.82023°W	—	Late 17th century	The farmhouse is in sandstone with some brick, and has a stone-slate roof. It has a T-shaped plan, with a main range and a cross wing to the left. There is also an outshut on the right. The house has two storeys, and an inserted door with a 20th-century glazed porch. Some of the windows are casements, and others are horizontally sliding sashes. Inside the house is an inglenook and a large bressumer.	II
Jumps Farmhouse; 53.58363°N 2.84205°W	—	1690	The house has been altered and enlarged. It is in brick on a sandstone plinth with a stone-slate roof, and has two storeys. The original part has a T-shaped plan, with a range of two bays and a cross wing to the left. Later an additional bay was added to the right, and in 1985 a right cross wing was built. On the front is a 20th-century gabled porch. The windows vary; some are fixed, some are casements, and there is also a French window. Inside the original part of the house is an inglenook and a bressumer.	II
Stable block, Lathom House Almshouses; 53.57836°N 2.82224°W	—	Early 18th century (probable)	The former stable block is in rendered stone and brick, and has a stone-slate roof. It is in a single-storey and forms an arcade of eleven round-headed arches with an impost band and keystones. The building has a plain coped parapet.	II
Stocks Farmhouse; 53.59867°N 2.79809°W	—	Early 18th century	The farmhouse is in pebbledashed brick with a rendered plinth and a composition tile roof. It has two storeys and three bays. On the front is a two-storey gabled porch with a square-headed doorway. The windows are casements.	II
The Croppers; 53.58269°N 2.82547°W	—	Early 18th century (probable)	A farmhouse in brick on a stone plinth with sandstone dressings and a stone-slate roof. It has two storeys with an attic and two bays. The windows are casements, and at the rear is a gabled stair turret. There is a single-storey extension.	II
Watkinson's Farmhouse; 53.58451°N 2.82576°W	—	Early 18th century	A brick farmhouse with a sandstone plinth and a stone-slate roof. There are two storeys, three bays, and a rear wing added later. On the front is a two-storey gabled porch with a round-headed doorway. The windows are casements.	II
Lathom House, former west wing 53.57602°N 2.81756°W		c. 1725–c. 1740	The west service wing of a once great country house by Giacomo Leoni in Palladian style. It is in sandstone with a slate roof, and consists of a main rectangular block with various outbuildings arranged around a courtyard at the rear. The main block has two storeys and a symmetrical front of seven bays. The middle three bays project forward under a pediment, and in the centre is a large round-headed archway with an architrave. The ground floor windows are tall with Gibbs surrounds and cornices, and in the upper floor are square windows with plain surrounds. In the centre of the roof is an octagonal cupola that has an ogival cap with a large ball finial and a weathervane. The building has been restored and converted for domestic use.	II*
Garden wall, Lathom House; 53.57615°N 2.81658°W	—	c. 1730	The garden wall is in sandstone with a moulded cornice and slightly rounded coping. It runs from the northeast corner of the surviving part of west wing of the hall, and runs to join the site of the demolished east wing. In the centre are low piers, and at each and are quadrants with ramps leading up to them.	II
Lathom Lodge and wall 53.57577°N 2.82550°W		c. 1730	The lodge, designed by Giacomo Leoni is in sandstone with a slate roof. It has an octagonal plan, it is in two storeys, and has a plinth, The ground floor is rusticated and there is a moulded cornice. The doorway has a square head and a Gibbs surround. The windows contain altered glazing. The attached wall and the gatepost are included in the listing.	II
Ormskirk Lodge, wall and gate pier 53.57625°N 2.82545°W		c. 1730	The lodge, designed by Giacomo Leoni is in sandstone with a slate roof. It has an octagonal plan, it is in two storeys, and has a plinth, The ground floor is rusticated and there is a moulded cornice. The doorway has a square head and a Gibbs surround. The windows contain altered glazing. Attached to the lodge is a high screen wall and a gate pier. The gate pier is 6.2 metres (20 ft) high, and has attached Tuscan columns, decorative bands, a pediment, a cornice, and round-headed niches with a large keystones.	II
Ha-ha; 53.57464°N 2.80892°W	—	Early to mid 18th century (probable)	The ha-ha is in the grounds of Lathom House. It is in sandstone and runs for about 100 metres (330 ft) to the east, and then turns to the north, following the line of the medieval moat. The structure is about 2 metres (6 ft 7 in) deep.	II
Needless Inn Farmhouse and garden wall 53.58025°N 2.83892°W	—	Early to mid 18th century	The house is in pebbledashed brick with a sandstone plinth and quoins, and has a stone-slate roof. There are two storeys with attics, and it is in an L-shaped plan, with a main range and a kitchen wing at the rear. The front has three bays and a two-storey porch with a round-headed outer doorway. The windows are three-light casements with segmental heads. The wall surrounds the north and west sides of the garden, it is in brick with sandstone coping, about 1 metre (3 ft 3 in) high, and it contains a gateway with rusticated stone jambs.	II
Spa Farmhouse; 53.56434°N 2.81094°W	—	Early to mid 18th century (probable)	The farmhouse has a main range in sandstone on a plinth, and a rear wing partly in sandstone and partly in brick. The roof is in stone-slate. The house has a T-shaped plan, two storeys with cellars, and a symmetrical three-bay front. In the centre is a doorway with a raised keystone on the lintel. The windows are vertical-rectangular with altered glazing. In the right gable wall is a blocked mullioned cellar window. The rear wing has a lean-to, a glazed porch, and casement windows.	II
Stand Farmhouse; 53.56649°N 2.82341°W	—	Early to mid 18th century	A brick house on a high chamfered sandstone plinth with a stone-slate roof, in two storeys. It has an L-shaped plan, with a main block and a rear wing. The front is symmetrical, with three bays, a square headed doorway, and sash windows. The ground floor windows have flat-arched heads, and those in the upper floor have segmental heads.	II
Barn and shippon, Needless Inn Farm; 53.58070°N 2.83952°W	—	Mid to late 18th century (probable)	The barn and shippon are in brick with stone-slate roofs, and form two rectangular blocks. The barn has three bays, and has two wagon entrances, a loading door, a doorway, and ventilation slits in a diamond pattern. The shippon has two storeys, four doorways, two loading doors, and a fixed window.	II
Barn, Spa Farm; 53.56477°N 2.81106°W	—	Mid to late 18th century (probable)	The barn is in sandstone with quoins and a stone-slate roof. The main part has five bays with a continuous outshut at the rear. At the front, the first two bays project as a cart shed, and the last two bays project as a two-storey stable block. Between them is a roof containing a pigeon loft. In the centre of the barn are opposing wagon entrances, and elsewhere are ventilations slits, doorways, and mullioned windows.	II
Briars Brook Culvert; 53.59434°N 2.82651°W		c. 1771	The culvert carries Eller Brook under the Leeds and Liverpool Canal. It is in sandstone, and consists of a single segmental arch with plain voussoirs, a plain band, and a parapet with rounded coping. On the west side is a curved and sloping abutment.	II
Tawd Culvert; 53.58910°N 2.80433°W	—	c. 1771 (probable)	The culvert carries the River Tawd under the Leeds and Liverpool Canal, and was rebuilt in 1838. It is in sandstone, and consists of a single round-headed arch with rusticated voussoirs, a dated keystone, a moulded cornice, a set-back parapet, and splayed abutments.	II
Moss Bridge; 53.59175°N 2.81080°W		c. 1771	This in bridge No. 35, and it carries Moss Bridge Lane over the Leeds and Liverpool Canal. The bridge is in sandstone, and consists of a single semi-elliptical arch with plain voussoirs, keystones, a plain band, a parapet, and plain pilasters at the ends.	II
Old Post Office; 53.58462°N 2.82529°W	—	Late 18th century (possible)	A small single-storey cottage in brick with a slate roof. It has a symmetrical front with two bays, a central doorway, and small-paned cast iron cross-window casements. At the rear is a small extension.	II
Robinson's Farmhouse; 53.57508°N 2.84885°W	—	Late 18th century (probable)	The farmhouse has been converted for other uses. It is in brick with a sandstone plinth and dressings, and it has a stone-slate roof. The building is in two storeys with an attic, and has a symmetrical front of two bays, with a central wooden doorway and porch. The windows on the front are casements, with a small attic window in the left gable wall, and a stair window at the rear.	II
Tawd Bridge; 53.59897°N 2.79718°W	—	Late 18th century (probable)	The bridge carries Deans Lane over the River Tawd. It is in sandstone, and consists of a single segmental arch with plain voussoirs, a plain band, and a parapet with rounded coping.	II
Tyrer's Farmhouse; 53.60201°N 2.79879°W	—	Late 18th century (probable)	A brick house with some sandstone dressings and a stone-slate roof, in two storeys. The main part has a symmetrical two-bay front, and there is a lean-to extension on the left. In the centre of the main part is a gabled single-storey porch with a round-arched head. There is one sliding sash window in the outshut, all the other windows being casements.	II
German's Lock and Bridge; 53.61163°N 2.82316°W		c. 1781	The lock and accommodation bridge are on the Rufford branch of the Leeds and Liverpool Canal. The lock is in sandstone with wooden gates, it has cast iron bollards on each side, and an overflow channel on the west side. The bridge has a single basket arch with rusticated voussoirs, a parapet with rounded coping, and terminal piers.	II
Lock Cottage; 53.60053°N 2.82716°W	—	c. 1781	The former canal lock-keeper's cottage stands by the towpath of the Rufford branch of the Leeds and Liverpool Canal. It is roughcast and has a composition tile roof. The cottage has two storeys and two bays, with three-light casement windows containing altered glazing. The entrance is in the right gable wall, and has a 20th-century glazed porch.	II
Junction Bridge, canal basin and dry dock 53.59703°N 2.83085°W		c. 1781	These are situated at the junction of the Leeds and Liverpool Canal with its Rufford Branch. The structures are in sandstone, with the basin at the entrance to the branch. The dry dock is at right-angles to it, and has an entrance of wooden beams, two flights of steps, and on the floor is a set of wooden trestles.	II
Runnel Brow Bridge; 53.59986°N 2.82809°W		c. 1781	The bridge carries School Lane over the Rufford branch of the Leeds and Liverpool Canal. It is in sandstone and has a parapet of rendered brick. It consists of a single semi-elliptical arch, with plain voussoirs, a plain band, and has plain pilasters at the ends.	II
Canal lock 53.60036°N 2.82759°W		c. 1781	The lock is to the north of Runnel Brow Bridge on the Rufford branch of the Leeds and Liverpool Canal. It is in sandstone and has wooden gates. There is a wooden footbridge over the lower entrance, and an overflow channel on the west side that is culverted at the north end.	II
Top locks; lower lock 53.59819°N 2.82983°W		1781	The lock is on the Rufford branch of the Leeds and Liverpool Canal, it is in sandstone and has wooden gates. There is a wooden footbridge over the lower entrance, and an overflow channel on the west side.	II
Top locks; upper lock 53.59736°N 2.83050°W		1781	The lock is on the Rufford branch of the Leeds and Liverpool Canal, it is in sandstone and has wooden gates. There are steps at the north end of west side, and a wooden footbridge over the lower entrance.	II
Wash-house building, Needless Inn Farm; 53.58015°N 2.83889°W	—	Late 18th or early 19th century (probable)	A brick building with a stone-slate roof, it has a square plan and is in a single storey. The front is gabled, and has a doorway and sliding sash windows. The interior is partitioned to form a privy. On the south side are two doorways, one leading to the privy. Inside the building are a cast iron pump, a large fireplace, and washing boilers.	II
Preston Lodge North, screen wall and gate 53.58157°N 2.82416°W	—	Late 18th or early 19th century (probable)	One of a pair of entrance lodges to Lathom Park, it is in sandstone with a pyramidal slate roof. The lodge has a square plan and is in a single storey with a moulded cornice and sash windows. At the rear is a small extension containing a doorway, and a small 20th-century greenhouse. The screen wall is attached to the lodge and ends in a square gate pier with a moulded cornice and an ornamental wrought iron gate.	II
Preston Lodge South, screen wall and gate 53.58144°N 2.82438°W	—	Late 18th or early 19th century (probable)	One of a pair of entrance lodges to Lathom Park, it is in sandstone with a pyramidal slate roof. The lodge has a square plan and is in a single storey with a moulded cornice and top-hung casement windows. At the rear is 20th-century extension. The screen wall is attached to the lodge and ends in a square gate pier with a moulded cornice and an ornamental wrought iron gate.	II
Junction Bridge; 53.59694°N 2.83096°W		1816	The bridge carries the towpath of the Leeds and Liverpool Canal over its junction with the Rufford Branch. It is in sandstone, and consists of a high semi-elliptical arch with rusticated voussoirs and a keystone flanked by panels containing the date. The bridge has a parapet with rounded coping, rusticated pilasters, and oval number plates.	II
Barn, Tyrer's Farm; 53.60223°N 2.79914°W	—	1822	A brick barn with a stone-slate roof in three unequal bays, containing a large semi-elliptical-headed wagon entrance and cross windows. In the right gable wall are three doorways, two circular pitching holes, and brick headers forming the date. Near the apex of the gable is a weathervane.	II
Vine Cottage; 53.59286°N 2.82554°W	—	Early 19th century	A sandstone house with a plinth, rusticated quoins, a moulded cornice, and a slate roof. It has two storeys and a symmetrical three-bay front. The central doorway is round-headed with imposts, a keystone, and a fanlight. The windows are sashes with wedge lintels imitating voussoirs.	II
Gate House, Daisy Lane; 53.59962°N 2.81409°W		c. 1860	Originally a railway level crossing keeper's cottage for the Manchester and Southport Railway, later a private house. It is in sandstone with a slate roof, and in Elizabethan style, There are two storeys. and a symmetrical two-bay front with rusticated quoins. In the centre is a single-story gabled porch with a Tudor arched doorway. The ground floor has cross-windows with hood moulds, and in the upper floor the windows are mullioned with gablets. In the right gable wall is a mullioned and transomed bay window and a cross-window.	II
Gate House, Culvert Lane; 53.59337°N 2.78283°W		c. 1860	Originally a railway level crossing keeper's cottage for the Manchester and Southport Railway, later a private house. It is in sandstone with a slate roof, and in Elizabethan style, There are two storeys. and a symmetrical two-bay front with rusticated quoins. In the centre is a single-story gabled porch with a Tudor arched doorway. The ground floor has cross-windows with hood moulds, and in the upper floor the windows are mullioned with gablets. In the left gable wall is a mullioned and transomed bay window and a cross-window.	II
Gate House, Deans Lane; 53.59603°N 2.79570°W	—	c. 1860	Originally a railway level crossing keeper's cottage for the Manchester and Southport Railway, later a private house. It is in sandstone with a slate roof, and in Elizabethan style, There are two storeys. and a symmetrical two-bay front with rusticated quoins. In the centre is a single-story gabled porch with a Tudor arched doorway. The ground floor has cross-windows with hood moulds, and in the upper floor the windows are mullioned with gablets. In the left gable wall is a mullioned and transomed bay window and a cross-window.	II
The Rookery and coach house 53.58146°N 2.82526°W	—	Mid to late 18th century	Originally a vicarage, later a private dwelling, it is in red brick with blue brick diapering, sandstone dressings, and a green slate roof. It has two storeys and an L-shaped plan, with a main range and a servants' wing. The east front is asymmetrical with three bays. The central bay has a single-storey porch that has a doorway with a Tudor arched fanlight, bands of checker-work, and a half-hipped roof with bargeboards. Above it is a turret-like half-dormer with a cross window. The south and west fronts have two bays, and contain canted bay windows. Most of the other windows are mullioned and transomed or are cross windows. There are finials on the apexes. The coach house at the rear is linked to the house by a 20th-century extension. It has a rectangular plan, two storeys and three bays.	II
Keepers Lodge and wall 53.57498°N 2.85089°W		1868	The lodge is in sandstone with a stone-slate roof, and is in Jacobean style. It has one storey, and is in an L-shaped plan. On the front facing the road is a gabled porch that contains a doorway with a moulded surround and a studded door, and in the gable is a carved shield. The windows are mullioned. In the right gable is a mullioned and transomed bay window, and a dated plaque. There is a full-height screen wall surrounding the courtyard at the rear.	II
Lathom Park Primary School; 53.57973°N 2.82581°W	—	1881	The school is in red brick with sandstone dressings, a green slate roof, and red ridge tiles, and is in Gothic style. It has a T-shaped plan, with a main range and a wing at the rear and porches in the angles, and is in a single storey. Features include triangular ventilators, buttresses, a bellcote, and lancet windows.	II
Gateway, Blythe Hall; 53.58222°N 2.84951°W	—	c. 1920	The gateway has a concave plan with central gates. The curving walls and the piers are in sandstone; there are two square piers flanking the gates, and two terminal piers surmounted by latticed standards carrying lamps. The standards and the gates are in iron.	II
War memorial 53.58148°N 2.82449°W		1923	The war memorial stands near the Preston Lodges at the entrance to Lathom Park. It is in sandstone and consists of a Latin cross with a plain square tapering chamfered shaft on a tapering and chamfered two-stage plinth with a base of two steps. On the plinth are inscriptions and the names of those lost in both World Wars.	II

== See also ==
- Listed buildings in Lathom South
