= Siege of Lathom House =

1645 battle

Coordinates: 53.576°N 2.817°W

- Part of the First English Civil War
- Sortie from Lathom House (after the painting by G. Cattermole, 1852)
Date	First siege 27 February – 27 May 1644; Second siege July – 2 December 1645
Location	Lathom, Lancashire
Result	1st Siege: Royalist victory 2nd Siege: Parliamentary victory

Belligerents
Royalists	Parliamentarians

Commanders and leaders
1st: Countess of Derby; 2nd: Edward Rawstorne	1st: Sir Thomas Fairfax; 2nd: Peter Egerton

Strength
1st: 300	1st: 2,000; 2nd: 4,000

Casualties and losses
1st: Fewer than 10	1st: 400–500

Lancashire and Lathom House

The siege of Lathom House was a military confrontation between a Parliamentarian army and a Royalist stronghold in Lathom near Ormskirk in Lancashire, during the First English Civil War. The first siege lasted from late February to late May 1644, when the siege was lifted. The second siege took place a year later from July to December 1645. Lathom House was captured and slighted.

== Background ==
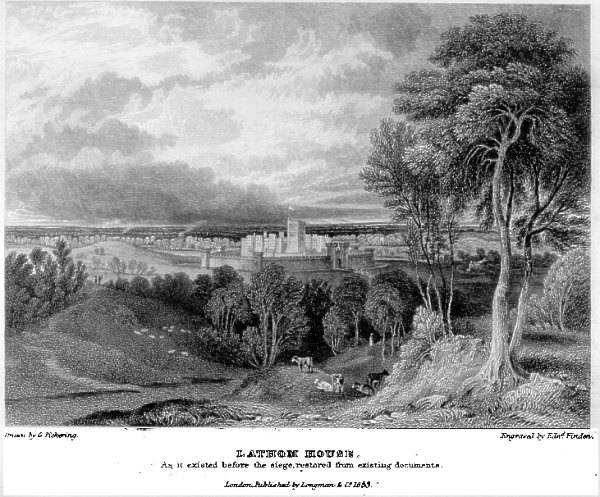
Illustration of Lathom House, prior to the siege

James Stanley, 7th Earl of Derby, was the leading Royalist adherent in the northwest of England when the civil war broke out in 1642. The family seat of the Stanleys was Lathom House. In 1643, the Earl of Derby was ordered by King Charles to fortify the Isle of Man against a possible Scottish invasion, and then move on to the northern campaign. His French wife, Charlotte de la Tremoüille, was left in charge of what turned out to be the last remaining Royalist stronghold in Lancashire. Sir Thomas Fairfax saw Derby's absence as an opportunity to strengthen the Long Parliament's position in Lancashire and set out to conquer Lathom House. Immediately after the fall of Warrington, the Parliamentarians requested that the countess acknowledge Parliament's authority and surrender her house, but she refused on the grounds that doing so would dishonour her husband. She offered to limit herself to defending her home, and this postponed further attacks on her position.

== First siege ==
When Fairfax arrived at Lathom House in February 1644, the Countess had made every effort to conceal the strength of the castle's fortifications. Fairfax demanded that the Countess surrender Lathom House to him. She asked for a week to consider his offer, and then insisted that it was only appropriate that he visit her at Lathom House for further negotiations. He was received as an honoured guest, but the entire household categorically rejected his terms for surrendering. He gave her two more days to consider her situation. The emissary sent two days later was scornfully dismissed.

The siege began with 2,000 Parliamentary soldiers (500 cavalry and 1,500 infantry) against a garrison of 300. The fortifications of Lathom House consisted of:

- Outer walls and embankments six feet thick
- An eight-yard moat
- Nine towers, each with six cannons, three pointing in either direction, and the Eagle Tower providing an excellent overview of the battlefield

In addition, the castle was at the lowest point in the middle of an open expanse that allowed superb views of the enemy's activities. Charlotte had assembled a militia of seasoned marksmen who were able to inflict significant losses by sniping.

John Seacome, an 18th-century historian of the House of Stanley quoted from another account A true and genuine account of the famous and ever memorable siege of Lathom-House in the County of Lancaster:

Latham-house stands upon a flat, upon a moorish, springy, and spumous ground; was encompassed by a strong wall of two yards thick; upon the wall were nine towers, flanking each other, and in every tower were six pieces of ordnance, that played three the one way, and three the other. Without the wall was a mote, eight yards wide, and two yards deep; upon the back of the mote, between the wall and the graff, was a strong row of palisadoes around; besides all these there was a high strong tower, called the Eagle Tower, in the midst of the house, surmounting all the rest; and the gate-house was also two high and strong buildings, with a strong tower on each side of it; and in the entrance to the first court upon the tops of these towers, were placed the best and choicest marksmen, who usually attended the Earl in his hunting and other sports, as huntsmen, keepers, fowlers, and the like; who continually kept watch with scrued [screwed] guns and long fowling pieces upon those towers, to the great annoyance and loss of the enemy, especially of their commanders, who were frequently killed in their trenches, or as they came or went to or from them.... Nature herself [seemed to have] formed [the house] for a strong hold or place of security.... The uncommon situation of it may be compared to the palm of a man's hand, flat in the middle, and covered with rising ground around it, and so near to it, that the enemy in a two year's siege, were never able to raise a battery against it so as to make a breach in the wall practicable to enter the house by way of storm.

The fortifications sustained continuous cannon and mortar fire with minimal damage. The Royalists launched several successful sorties to disrupt Parliamentary efforts to set up batteries. As a result, Parliamentary forces were unable to establish any major artillery positions against the castle, and the army refused to replenish those guns that were lost or spiked during the sorties. Morale among the Roundheads also suffered greatly as the besieged shot soldiers and engineers on the battlefield.

Nevertheless, Fairfax persisted in demanding that Charlotte surrender to his forces, going so far as to obtain a letter from Lord Stanley asking for safe passage for her. She refused to surrender under any terms, rebuking messengers in increasingly disdainful tones.

After one particularly audacious sortie in late April that destroyed several Roundhead positions, Fairfax declared a day of fasting and prayer in his camp. One of the chaplains invoked the following verse from Jeremiah 50:14:

Put yourselves in array against Babylon on every side: all ye that bend the bow, shoot at her, spare no arrows: for she hath sinned against the Lord.

Captain Hector Schofield, a messenger from Colonel Alexander Rigby of the Roundheads, arrived to offer Charlotte an honourable surrender. She threatened to hang him from the tower gates, then asked him to convey the following while she tore the message:

Carry this answer back to Rigby, and tell that insolent rebel, he shall have neither persons, goods, nor house. When our strength and provisions are spent, we shall find a fire more merciful than Rigby; and then, if the providence of God prevent it not, my goods and house shall burn in his sight; and myself, children, and soldiers, rather than fall into his hands will seal our religion and loyalty in the same flames.

A similar ultimatum issued by Rigby on 23 May prompted Charlotte to respond: "The mercies of the wicked are cruel .... unless they treated with her lord, they should never take her or any of her friends alive".

The siege was lifted on the night of 27 May as the Royalist general Prince Rupert approached Lathom with thousands of cavalry and infantry. Charlotte and her household departed for the Isle of Man, leaving the care of Lathom House to Colonel Edward Rawstorne.

== Second siege ==
After the Parliamentary victory at the Battle of Marston Moor, which was fought 2 July 1644, the north of England was largely under Parliamentary control apart from areas close to Royalist garrisons such as Lathom House. The next year (1645), in July, 4,000 Parliamentary troops returned to begin the second siege. Their commander Colonel Peter Egerton made Ormskirk his headquarters while his men encamped on Aughton Moss (or Aughton Moor), near Aughton Mill. Trenchfield House, on the site of this encampment, still retains the name.

The garrison did not capitulate quickly, but when it became clear that no relief could be expected, and supplies were running short, famine forced Colonel Rawstorne's hand and he surrendered at discretion to Colonel Egerton on 2 December 1645.

== Aftermath ==
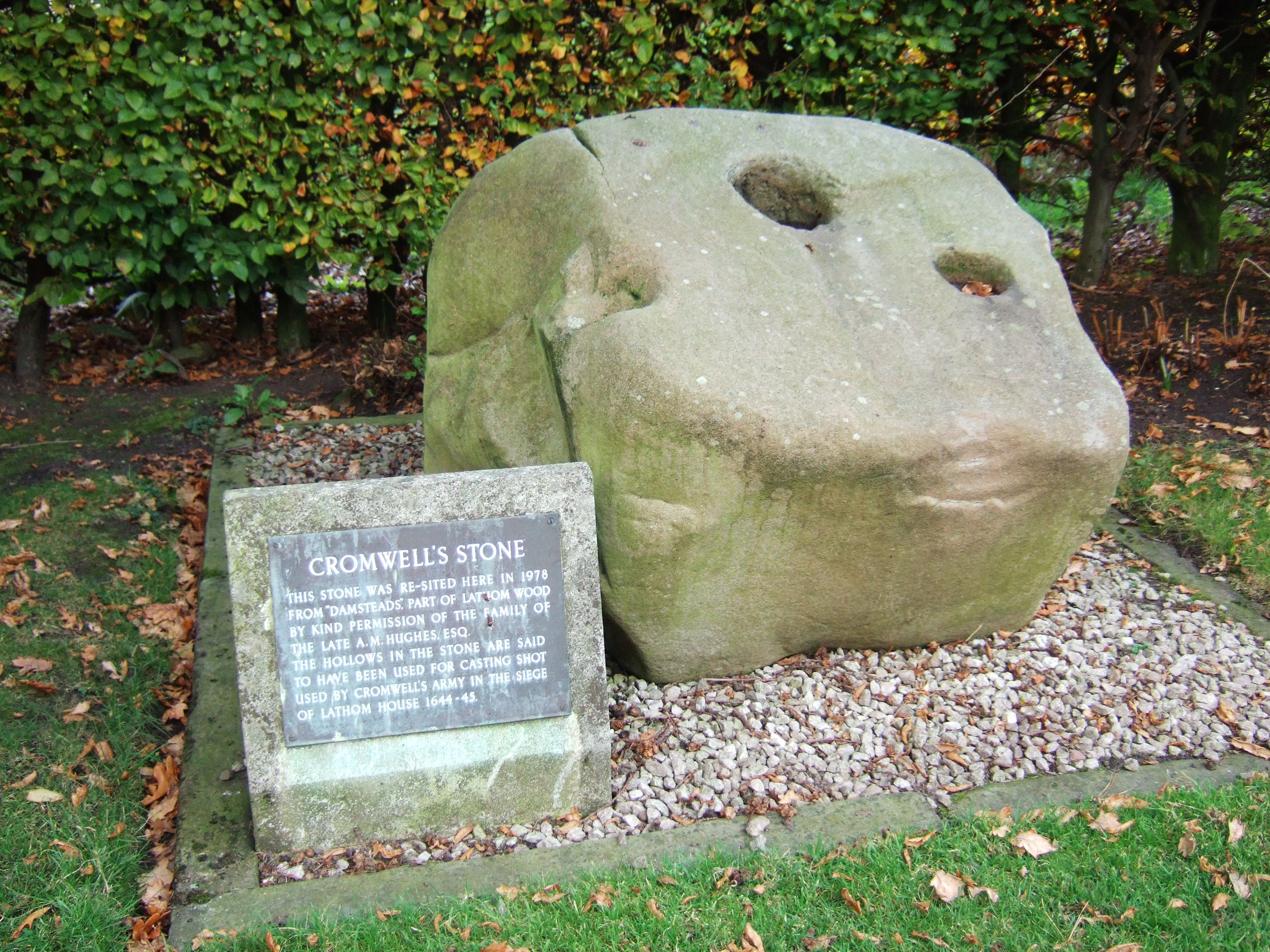
Cromwell's Stone. The hollows in the stone are said to have been used for casting shot by Cromwell's army in the siege of Lathom House.

The fall of Lathom House was regarded as an event of the first importance by the Parliamentary party. Besides the material gain of twelve pieces of cannon and a large store of arms and ammunition, the Parliamentarians had achieved a great moral triumph in the fall of the famous royalist house, and an order was issued by the House of Commons "for the ministers about London to give public thanks to God, on the next Lord's Day, for its surrender".

After the Restoration the property was regained by the Derby family, and in the early part of the eighteenth century it was still occasionally inhabited by them, but Knowsley Hall succeeded Lathom House as the principal seat of the Stanley family.

== In Literature ==
- Letitia Elizabeth Landon's poem 'Lord and Lady Derby' and the notes attached reflect on Lady Derby's fortitude during the siege.

== Popular culture ==
- The song "They called her Babylon" by Steeleye Span tells the story of the siege. It appears on their 2004 album of the same name.
