= Lathom House =

Country house in Lancashire, England

Coordinates: 53.5758°N 2.8170°W

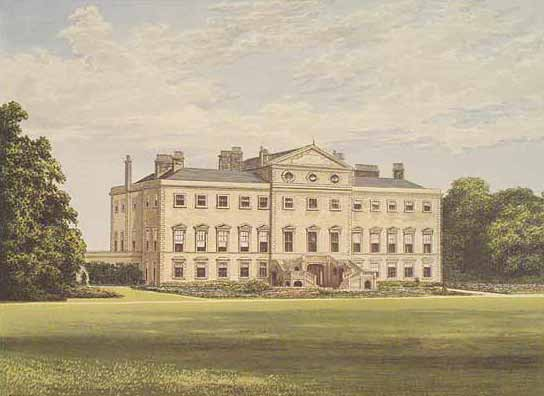
Lathom House, Morris's Country Seats 1880

Lathom House was a large country house in the parish of Lathom in Lancashire, England. Built between 1725 and 1740, the main block was demolished in 1925.

== Early history ==
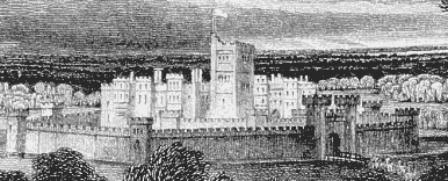
Artist's impression (1864) of Lathom House at the time of the Civil War

Arms of Latham of Latham: Or, on a chief indented azure, three plates. Quartered by Stanley, Earl of Derby

A wooden castle is believed to have stood on the site in mediaeval times. Sir John I Stanley of the Isle of Man (1350–1414), Lord Lieutenant of Ireland and King of Mann married Isabel Latham, daughter and heiress of Sir Thomas Latham of Latham. The stone-built castle known as Lathom House, built by the Stanley family in 1496, had eighteen towers, and was surrounded by a wall six foot thick and a moat eight yards wide, its drawbridge defended by a gateway tower. In the centre of the site was a tall tower known as the Eagle Tower.

In 1554, Protestant martyr George Marsh, was questioned at Lathom House by Edward Stanley, 3rd Earl of Derby before being sent to Lancaster Castle.

Lathom House was the last Royalist stronghold in Lancashire during the English Civil War and was twice besieged by Parliamentarian forces. During the first Siege of Lathom House by Sir Thomas Fairfax in 1644, the house was defended by Charlotte Stanley, Countess of Derby and 300 men who kept possession until Royalist forces under Prince Rupert of the Rhine arrived in the area en route to attack Bolton. After the siege, at Rupert's insistence, the countess and her retinue moved to the Isle of Man, with the defence of the house being entrusted to professional soldiers. In 1645 the house was again besieged by General Egerton with 4000 Parliamentarian soldiers, and was surrendered after a protracted siege after which the fortifications were demolished by the Parliamentarians. James Stanley, 7th Earl of Derby, husband of Charlotte, was beheaded in Bolton by the Parliamentarians in 1651 for treason. The Stanley manors were confiscated by Parliament.

== Post Restoration ==
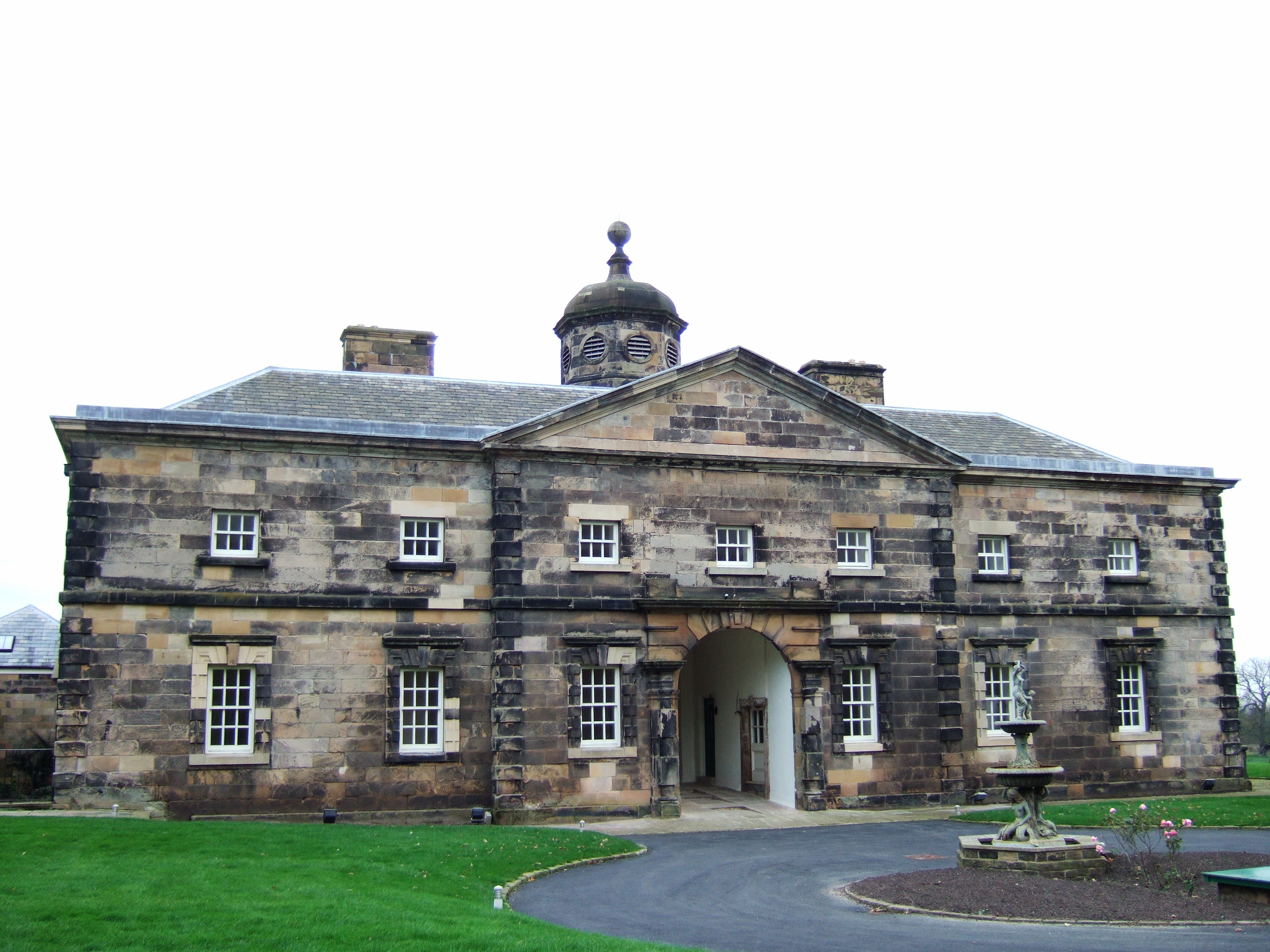
The surviving West Wing of Lathom House

After the Restoration of the monarchy in 1660, Lathom House was returned to the Stanleys and remained with them until 1714 when it passed by the marriage of Henrietta Stanley to John Ashburnham, 3rd Baron Ashburnham who sold it.

It was subsequently bought by Sir Thomas Bootle, MP for Liverpool, who commissioned Giacomo Leoni to rebuild the house as the finest Palladian house in the county. Built over 15 years from 1725 to 1740, its deer park was designed by renowned landscape gardener Humphry Repton.

It passed through his niece to Richard Wilbraham Bootle and their son, Edward, Lord Skelmersdale. The latter's grandson Edward inherited and was made Earl of Lathom. Edward's son, the second earl, was accidentally shot and died in 1910. The last resident of Lathom House was Edward Bootle-Wilbraham 3rd Earl of Lathom (and 4th Baron of Skelmersdale). During the First World War the hall was used for military purposes, mainly the training of horses, and after the war the third earl decided not to renovate and reoccupy it but to live instead at nearby Blythe Hall.

The estate was sold in 1920 to a London consortium. After a brief period as a boys’ school, the main block of the house was demolished in 1925. The estate land of 4,000 acres (1,600 ha) was sold piecemeal, mainly to the tenants. The remaining west wing of the house was converted to apartments.

== Archaeology ==
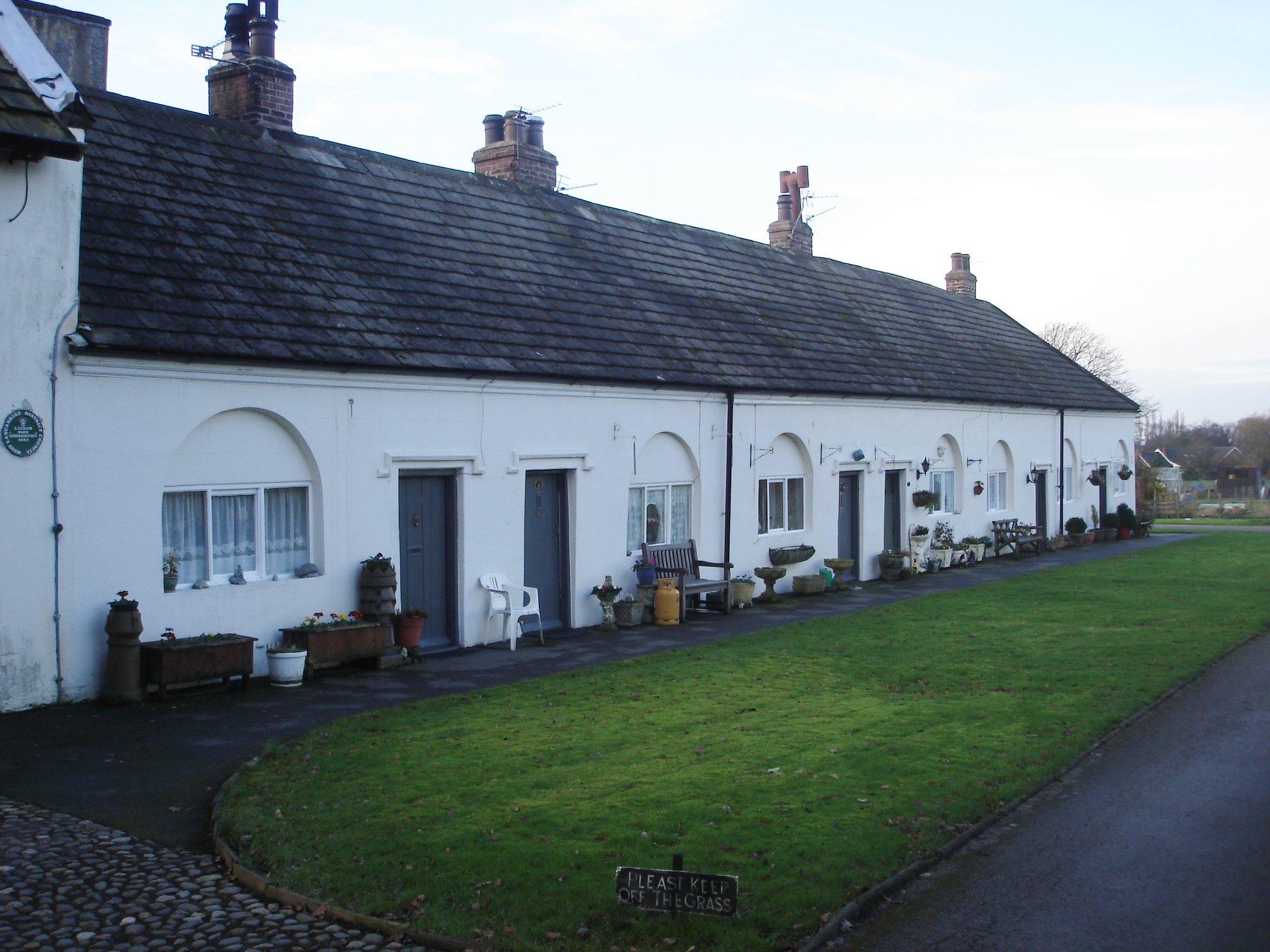
Almshouses near site of house

The ruins of Lathom House were excavated by the Historical Council of Northern Lancashire, in its efforts to reconstruct the 18th-century buildings; the team on site came across medieval foundations and have tried to salvage them. While the main buildings became uninhabitable several decades ago, there are almshouse cottages neighbouring the Lathom Park Chapel.

== See also ==
- Listed buildings in Lathom
