= Baron Skelmersdale =

Barony in the Peerage of the United Kingdom

Baron Skelmersdale, of Skelmersdale in the County Palatine of Lancaster, is a title in the Peerage of the United Kingdom. It was created in 1828 for the former Member of Parliament for Westbury, Newcastle-under-Lyme, Clitheroe and Dover, Edward Bootle-Wilbraham. His grandson, the second Baron (the son of the Hon. Richard Bootle-Wilbraham), was a Conservative politician and served in the Conservative administrations of Disraeli and Lord Salisbury. In 1880 he was created Earl of Lathom, in the County Palatine of Lancaster, in the Peerage of the United Kingdom. However, the earldom became extinct on the death of his grandson, the third Earl, in 1930. The barony passed to the last Earl's second cousin once removed, the fifth Baron, who was the grandson of a younger son of the first Baron. On his death, the title was inherited by his cousin, the sixth Baron.

His son, the seventh Baron, served in junior ministerial positions in the Conservative administrations of Margaret Thatcher and was as one of the ninety-two elected hereditary peers allowed to remain after the passing of the House of Lords Act of 1999. As of 2018, the title is held by his son, the eighth Baron, who succeeded him in that year.

== Baron Skelmersdale (1828) ==
- Edward Bootle-Wilbraham, 1st Baron Skelmersdale (1771–1853)
- Edward Bootle-Wilbraham, 2nd Baron Skelmersdale (1837–1898, created Earl of Lathom in 1880)

=== Earl of Lathom (1880) ===
- Edward Bootle-Wilbraham, 1st Earl of Lathom, 2nd Baron Skelmersdale (1837–1898)
- Edward George Bootle-Wilbraham, 2nd Earl of Lathom, 3rd Baron Skelmersdale (1864–1910)
- Edward William Bootle-Wilbraham, 3rd Earl of Lathom, 4th Baron Skelmersdale (1895–1930)

=== Baron Skelmersdale (1828; reverted) ===
- Arthur George Bootle-Wilbraham, 5th Baron Skelmersdale (1876–1969)
- Lionel Bootle-Wilbraham, 6th Baron Skelmersdale (1896–1973)
- Roger Bootle-Wilbraham, 7th Baron Skelmersdale (1945–2018)
- Andrew Bootle-Wilbraham, 8th Baron Skelmersdale (b. 1977)

The heir apparent is the present holder's son, the Hon. Daniel Peter Bootle-Wilbraham (b. 2007).

=== Male-line family tree ===
Male-line family tree, Barons Skelmersdale and Earls of Lathom.

Baron Skelmersdale
Edward Bootle-Wilbraham; 1st Baron Skelmersdale; 1771–1853
Hon. Richard Bootle-Wilbraham; 1801–1844	Col. Hon. Edward Bootle-Wilbraham; 1807–1882
Earl of Lathom
Edward Bootle-Wilbraham; 1st Earl of Lathom; 2nd Baron Skelmersdale; 1837–1898	Col. Arthur Bootle-Wilbraham; 1842–1897	Major; Lionel Bootle-Wilbraham; 1853–1914
Edward Bootle-Wilbraham; 2nd Earl of Lathom; 3rd Baron Skelmersdale; 1864–1910	Hon. Villiers Bootle-Wilbraham; 1867–1913	Hon. Randle Bootle-Wilbraham; 1868–1889	Hon. Reginald Bootle-Wilbraham; 1875–1912	Arthur Bootle-Wilbraham; 5th Baron Skelmersdale; 1876–1969	Dr. Evelyn Bootle-Wilbraham; 1877–1955	Major; Claude Bootle-Wilbraham; 1877–1955	Lionel Bootle-Wilbraham; 6th Baron Skelmersdale; 1896–1973
Edward Bootle-Wilbraham; 3rd Earl of Lathom; 4th Baron Skelmersdale; 1895–1930	Roger Bootle-Wilbraham; 7th Baron Skelmersdale; 1945–2018
Earldom extinct
Andrew Bootle-Wilbraham; 8th Baron Skelmersdale born 1977
Hon. Daniel Bootle-Wilbraham born 2007
