= Barrow Nook =

Small rural hamlet on the fringes of Bickerstaffe in the county of Lancashire, England

Coordinates: 53.518°N 2.836°W

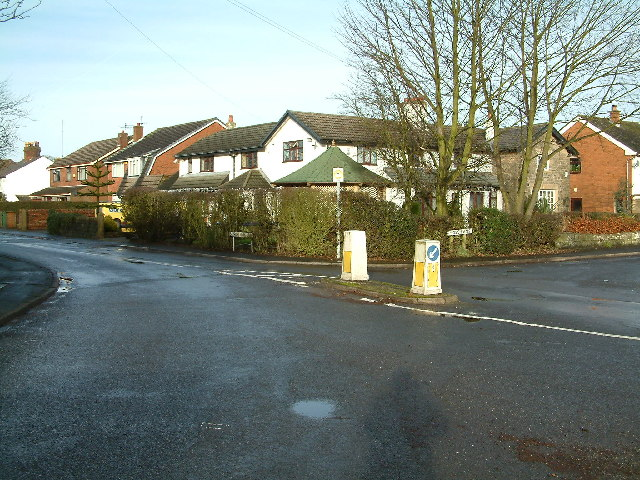
- Barrow Nook

- Location in West Lancashire Location within Lancashire
- OS grid reference: SD445027
- Civil parish: Bickerstaffe
- District: West Lancashire
- Shire county: Lancashire
- Region: North West
- Country: England
- Sovereign state: United Kingdom
- Post town: ORMSKIRK
- Postcode district: L39
- Dialling code: 01695
- Police: Lancashire
- Fire: Lancashire
- Ambulance: North West
- UK Parliament: West Lancashire

Barrow Nook is a small rural hamlet on the fringes of Bickerstaffe in the county of Lancashire, England.

Stone quarried from Barrow Nook was used to build the church and school at Bickerstaffe in the early 1840s.

Barrow Nook Hall was the former home of Richard John Seddon, until he emigrated in 1866. He later became Prime Minister of New Zealand.
