= George Lyon (highwayman) =

George Lyon (c. 1761–22 April 1815) was a highwayman in England.

Lyon was born in Upholland, Lancashire, to a poor family and was a career criminal.

== Prior to arrest ==
George Lyon's one major feat as a highwayman was to hold up the Liverpool mail coach. With his accomplices, who have been unknown since, he planned the robbery at the Legs of Man public house in Wigan. They then persuaded the ostler at the Bull's Head Inn in Upholland to lend them horses for a few hours. They held up the Liverpool mail coach at nearby Tawd Vale on the River Tawd, firing two shots and forcing the driver to pull up so that they could rob the passengers. The gang then returned to the Bull's Head, and when the robbed coach later arrived at the inn, Lyon and his accomplices had an alibi as people had seen them in the pub earlier in the afternoon.

In addition to this robbery, Lyon was a habitual thief, and had been transported to one of the colonies for some years before returning to Upholland.

Local legend suggests Lyon was inept at highway robbery. It is said that he decided to hold up the coach taking the wages to a local coal mine but on the day of his intended crime it was pouring with rain. He stood out to stop the coach too early and the rain ruined the gunpowder in his pistol – the coach's driver, perhaps realising this, simply coaxed the horses into a run and soaked Lyon with muddy water as they flew past.

== Arrest and execution ==
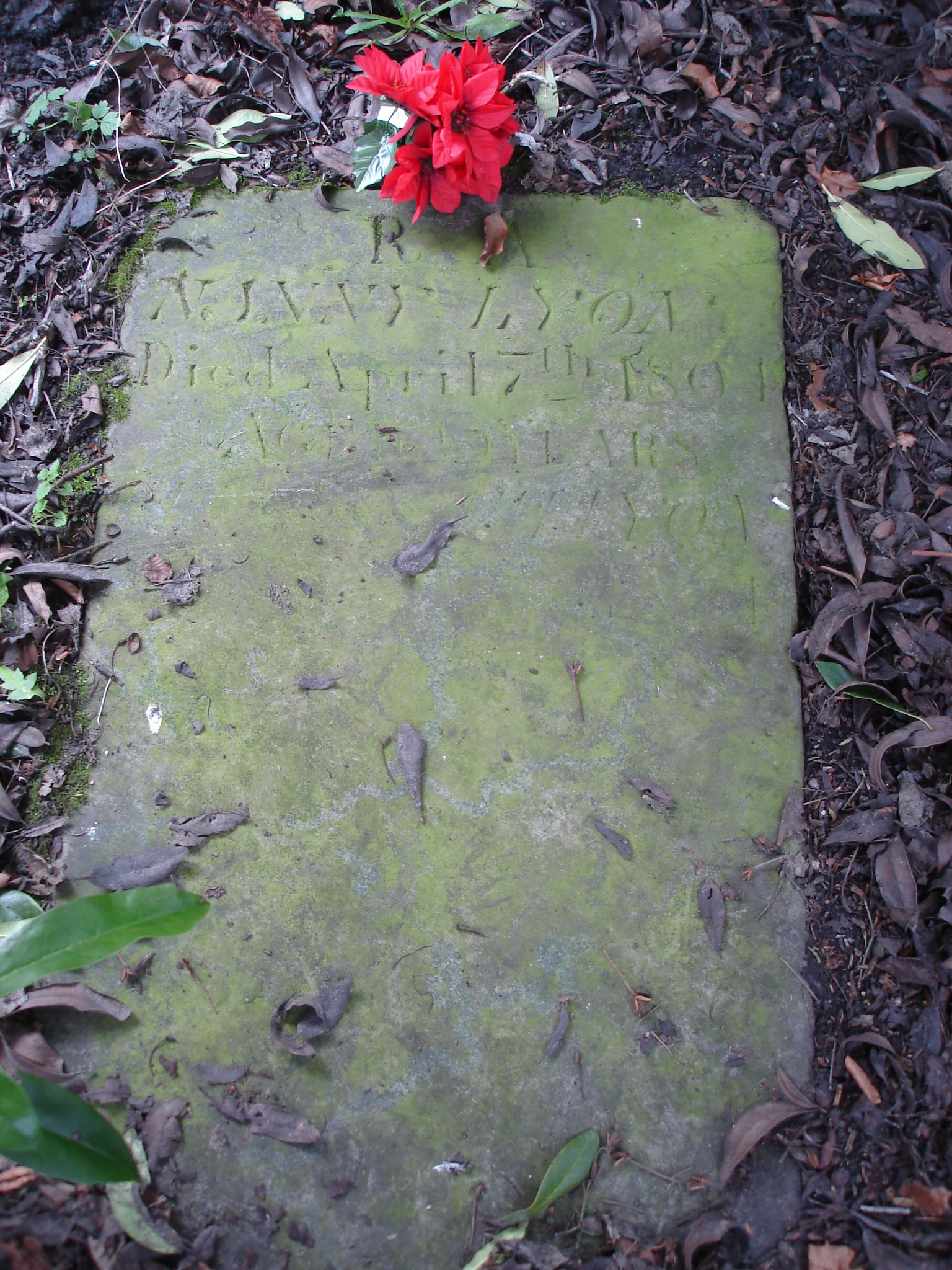
Grave of George Lyon and daughter Nanny

George Lyon was 54 when he was executed in Lancaster by hanging for robbery. Sentence was passed on Saturday 8 April 1815 along with two accomplices, Houghton and Bennett.

A fourth accomplice was Edward Ford, who had been working as a painter at Walmsley House, where the last robbery took place and for which Lyon and his accomplices were eventually indicted. Ford had suggested robbing the house to Lyon, and had himself taken part in some 17 previous robberies, but because he turned King's evidence he was spared the capital sentence. The execution of Lyon, Houghton, and Bennett, took place just before noon on Saturday 22 April 1815.

All capital sentences passed that day were commuted, except for the Upholland trio of Lyon, Houghton and Bennett, and two others, Moses Owen for horse stealing, and John Warburton for "highway robbery".

After his death Lyon's body was handed over to Simon Washington, landlord of The Old Dog Inn in Upholland, and a companion, for its return to Upholland for burial. Lyon had not wanted his body left at Lancaster as it would have been handed over to surgeons for dissection as was the normal procedure with the bodies of executed criminals. In a letter to his wife written on 14 April (with the aid of the prison chaplain, the Reverend Cowley), he implored her to arrange for his body to be returned home.

As the cart approached the final part of its journey, a huge crowd was observed moving off from Orrell Post near Upholland in the direction of Gathurst, to observe the return of Lyon's body. When word came through that the cortege was instead passing through nearby Wrightington and heading for the road through Appley Bridge instead, the crowd rushed across the fields from the Gathurst Bridge which still spans the Leeds and Liverpool Canal, to meet the cart at Dangerous Corner, and then followed it in procession through Appley Bridge, and up the climb through Roby Mill, until it eventually reached Parliament Street in Upholland, and the last few hundred yards to The Old Dog Inn, where Lyon's body was laid out in the landlady's best parlour overnight.

Hundreds of people gathered outside the pub the next day, and even climbed onto the roofs of adjoining buildings, to see the coffin as it was taken for burial to St. Thomas's churchyard in Upholland on Sunday 23 April 1815. George Lyon was buried in his daughter's grave (not, as is traditionally believed, that of his mother or grandmother), the inscription simply reads "Nanny Lyon, Died April 7th 1804". His name is not recorded on the stone.
