= Listed buildings in Lathom South =

Lathom South is a civil parish in the West Lancashire district of Lancashire, England. It contains four listed buildings that are recorded in the National Heritage List for England. All the listed buildings are designated at Grade II, the lowest of the three grades, which is applied to "buildings of national importance and special interest". The parish is rural, and all the listed buildings are farmhouses or farm buildings.

== Buildings ==
Name and location	Photograph	Date	Notes
Heyes Farmhouse; 53.56124°N 2.83207°W	—	Mid 18th century	A brick house, partly rendered on a high stone plinth with a slate roof. It has two storeys with attics, and a rectangular plan with a single-storey extension at the rear. On the front are three bays and a two-storey gabled porch with a round-headed archway. Most of the windows are tall with segmental heads. In the gable walls are small attic windows, and the left side also has a glazed porch.
Ottershead Farmhouse; 53.56651°N 2.83770°W	—	Mid 18th century	A brick farmhouse with a sandstone plinth and dressings, and a stone-slate roof. It has two storeys with attics, and two bays with a rear service wing. The front is symmetrical and contains a doorway with a pediment, banded pilasters, a lintel with triglyphs, and a pulvinated frieze. The windows are sashes. At the rear are stone blocks incorporating an altered doorway with a lintel and keystone.
Barn, Ottershead Farm; 53.56663°N 2.83820°W	—	Mid 18th century (probable)	The barn is in brick with a sandstone plinth and dressings, and a roof of composition tiles. It has a rectangular plan with six bays, and contains rusticated quoins, and a wagon entrance with a porch. There are also doorways and a loading door, most with pseudo-voussoirs and keystones.
Brighouse Green Farmhouse; 53.55893°N 2.83503°W	—	1768	A brick farmhouse, partly rendered, with sandstone dressings and a stone-slate roof, in two storeys and three bays. On the front is a single-storey gabled porch with a round-headed outer doorway. Above the porch is a shaped datestone. The windows are three-light casements with stone sills and lintels. The left gable wall contains a gabled porch and two blocked doorways.

== See also ==
- Listed buildings in Lathom
