= Bickerstaffe =

Village in Lancashire, England

Coordinates: 53.534°N 2.838°W

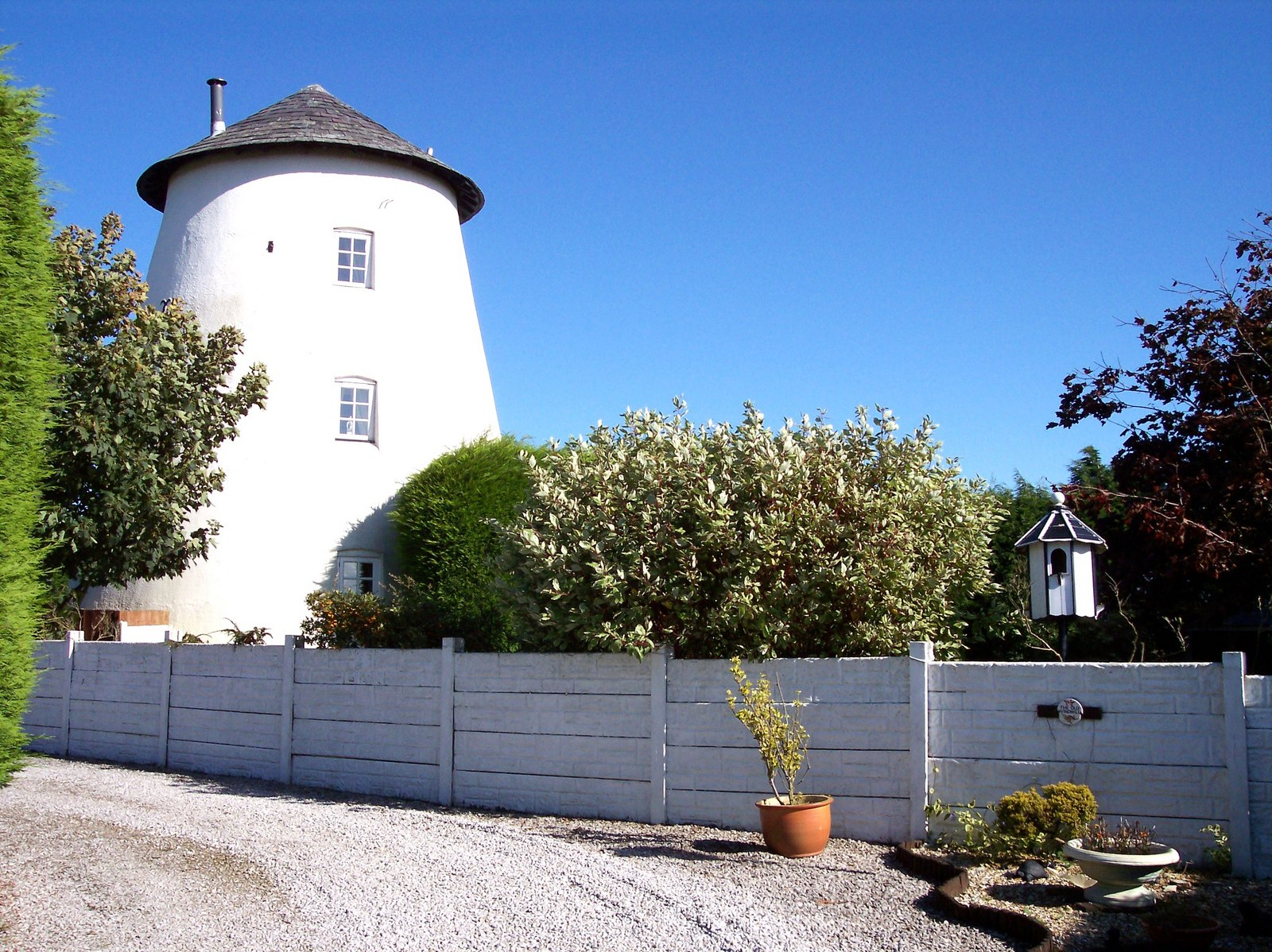
- The old windmill

- Location in West Lancashire Location within Lancashire
- Population: 1,180 (2011 census)
- OS grid reference: SD445045
- Civil parish: Bickerstaffe
- District: West Lancashire
- Shire county: Lancashire
- Region: North West
- Country: England
- Sovereign state: United Kingdom
- Post town: ORMSKIRK
- Postcode district: L39
- Dialling code: 01695
- Police: Lancashire
- Fire: Lancashire
- Ambulance: North West
- UK Parliament: West Lancashire

Bickerstaffe is a village and civil parish in the West Lancashire district of Lancashire, England. According to the 2001 census the population of the civil parish was 1,196, reducing to 1,180 at the 2011 census, although the population of the electoral ward, which includes Lathom South, was slightly greater at 2,013, reducing to 1,988 at the 2011 census. The village is near junction 3 of the M58 motorway, and is about four miles west of Skelmersdale.

== History ==
Its name may come from Anglo-Saxon bïcera stæþ = "the beekeepers' landing-place".

The moated site of the original Bickerstaffe Hall is situated about 70 metres (230 ft) south-west of the present building. A trapezoidal island with maximum dimensions of around 68 by 68 metres (223 ft × 223 ft) is surrounded by a partially infilled moat between about 3 and 6 metres (9.8 and 19.7 ft) wide and up to 1.3 metres (4 ft 3 in) deep. The current hall may date to 1667 and was built for a member of the Stanley family, however it was re-built or heavily modified in 1772.

Bickerstaffe Stocks are one of the listed structures of historical importance in the village.

In the seventeenth century, Bickerstaffe was an important local centre of the Quakers in West Lancashire.

The parish church is dedicated to the Holy Trinity. Being built in 1843, and then extended in 1860, with a bell tower and spire to the west. It was designed by architect Sydney Smirke, with multiple examples of fine masonry. Such as the carved angles above the doorway, as well as royal heads carved into the accent stones either side of each of the northern and western windows.

Until October 1936 Bickerstaffe Colliery was located just south of M6 junction 3.

2012 saw the start of United Utilities £63m scheme at Bickerstaffe Water Treatment works to reduce the reliance of the local water supply on the River Dee. That initiative comes in two parts: drilling new boreholes to find new water sources, and extending Bickerstaffe Water Treatment Works to cope with the rising demand for water.

== Sport ==
The grounds of Bickerstaffe AFC are at Hall Lane next to Bickerstaffe C.E school.

== Culture ==
An annual music festival, Bickerstock, takes place in the summer season, featuring local and international artists, and drawing in increasingly large crowds.

== Notable people ==
- Sir Nicholas Atherton (c.1357-1420), Lord of Bickerstaffe, politician and MP of the Parliament of England for Lancashire in 1401.
- Thomas Aspinwall (1846–1901), a British trade unionist, first president of the Lancashire and Cheshire Miners' Federation
- Sir Samuel Rosbotham (1864–1950), a British farmer and National Labour politician, MP for Ormskirk 1929 to 1939.
- Norman Thomas (1947 or 1948 – 2011), broadcaster, businessman and journalist; a founding member of Liverpool's Radio City, lived locally

== See also ==
- Listed buildings in Bickerstaffe
- Scheduled monuments in Lancashire
