= River Tawd =

River in West Lancashire, England

Coordinates: 53.6065°N 2.7927°W

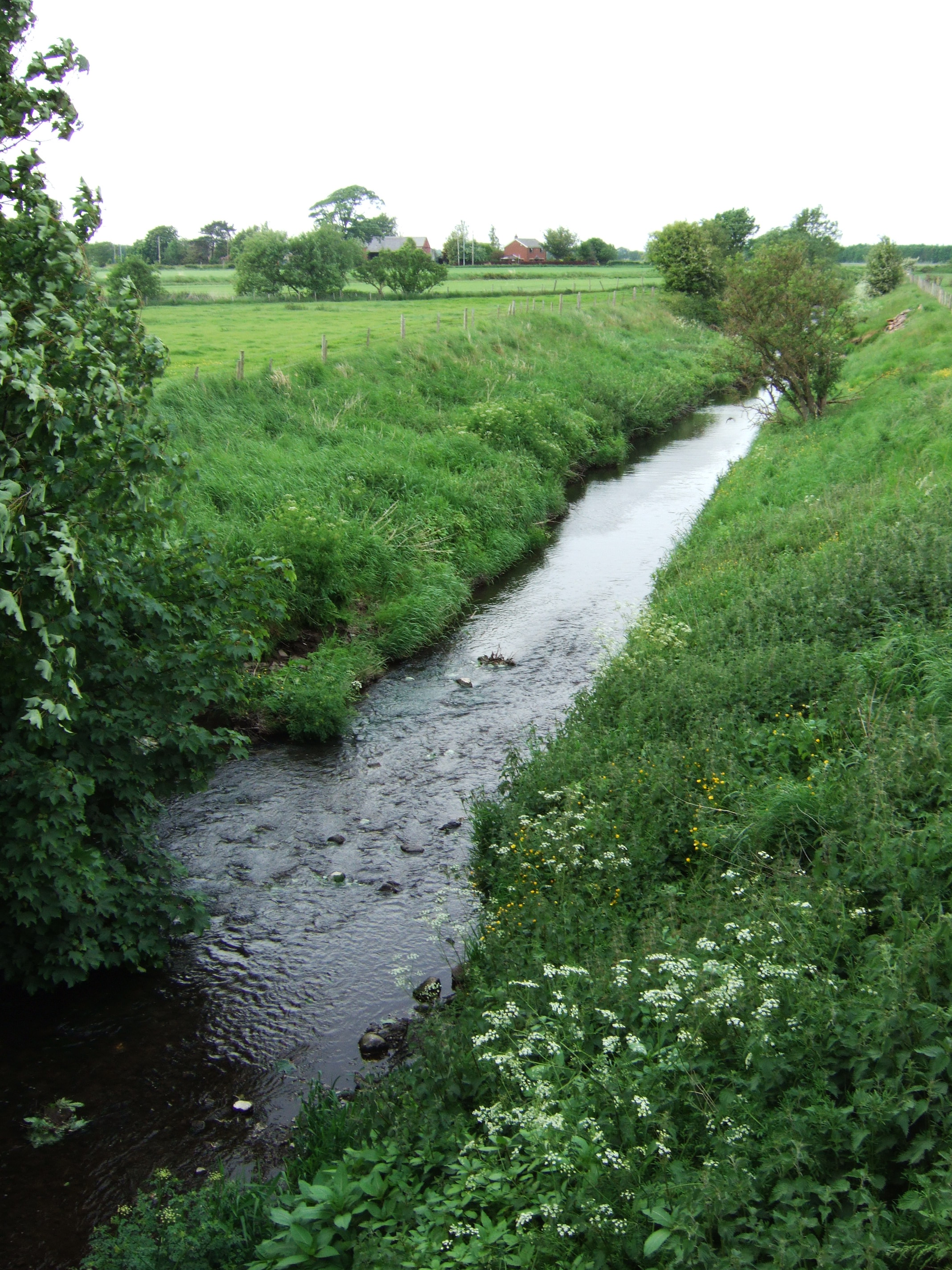
River Tawd in Lathom.

The River Tawd flows through Skelmersdale and Lathom in West Lancashire.

Tawd Bridge carried Ormskirk Road, the main arterial road from Wigan to Ormskirk and Southport. This is well known to Upholland locals as the place where highwayman George Lyons held up his victims during the 18th century. Today, the river flows through the middle of Skelmersdale in large culverts. It emerges near the town's shopping centre, the Concourse, and flows into a country park and Tawd Vale Adventure Centre, a Scout campsite owned and operated by Merseyside Scouts, on the site of the 19th and early 20th century colliery. Parts of the river are a county biological heritage site.

It is a tributary of the River Douglas which it joins in Lathom.

== Water quality ==
The Environment Agency measures the water quality of the river systems in England. Each is given an overall ecological status, which may be one of five levels: high, good, moderate, poor and bad. There are several components that are used to determine this, including biological status, which looks at the quantity and varieties of invertebrates, angiosperms and fish. Chemical status, which compares the concentrations of various chemicals against known safe concentrations, is rated good or fail.

The water quality of the River Tawd was as follows in 2016. Reasons for the quality being less than good include physical modification of the channel and some sewage discharge.

Section	Ecological Status	Chemical Status	Overall Status	Length	Catchment	Channel
Tawd	Moderate	Good	Moderate	7.8 miles (12.6 km)	11.88 square miles (30.8 km^{2})	heavily modified

== Tributaries ==
- Slate Brook
- Grimshaw Brook
