= Lathom =

Village in Lancashire, England

Coordinates: 53.590°N 2.820°W

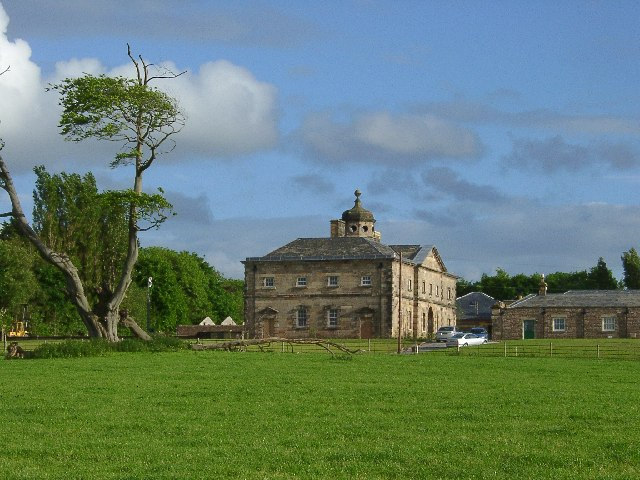
- View of the surviving west wing of Lathom House

- Location in West Lancashire Location within Lancashire
- Population: 914 (2011)
- OS grid reference: SD458107
- Civil parish: Lathom
- District: West Lancashire
- Shire county: Lancashire
- Region: North West
- Country: England
- Sovereign state: United Kingdom
- Post town: ORMSKIRK
- Postcode district: L40
- Dialling code: 01695/01704
- Police: Lancashire
- Fire: Lancashire
- Ambulance: North West
- UK Parliament: West Lancashire

Lathom (/ˈleɪðəm/) is a village and civil parish in Lancashire, England, near Skelmersdale, about 3 miles (5 km) east of Ormskirk. It is in the district of West Lancashire, and with the parish of Newburgh forms part of Newburgh ward. The population of the civil parish at the 2011 census was 914. The Leeds and Liverpool Canal passes through the parish of Lathom.

== History ==
=== Toponymy ===
Lathom was recorded as Latune in the Domesday Book in 1086, Lathum in 1200, and Lathom in 1223 after which it was the usual spelling. It derives from the dative plural of Old Norse hlaða, a barn. Lathom thus means at the barns.

=== Manor ===
In 1066 the manor of Lathom was the most important of 17 manors held by Uctred, an Anglo-Danish landowner. These manors were set up by Æthelstan in the 10th century. By 1189 Robert Fitzhenry de Lathom possessed lands throughout south Lancashire, extending to Flixton in the barony of Manchester. Siward son of Dunning held the township in thanage in the reign of Henry II. Robert de Lathom, in the reign of Edward I was granted the right to hold a market and an annual fair. Robert Lathom founded Burscough Priory in or before 1189.

The manor was conveyed by the marriage of Isabella de Lathom, Sir Thomas Lathom's daughter, to Sir John Stanley in 1385; Thomas Stanley, 1st Earl of Derby entertained Henry VII in his castle at Lathom. The present West Wing of Lathom House gives a hint of the importance of Lathom and the Stanley family who became the earls of Derby. The village grew around the castle at Lathom.

=== Lathom House ===
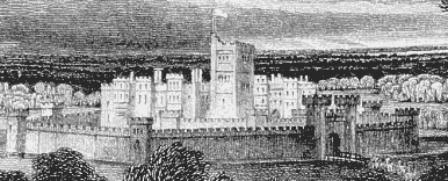
Artist's impression of Lathom House at the time of the English Civil War

Lathom is the location of Lathom House built in the Middle Ages, seat of the de Lathom and Stanley families, twice besieged during the English Civil War and subsequently bought by Sir Thomas Bootle who restored the ancient mansion. It passed through his niece to Richard Wilbraham and their son, Lord Skelmersdale. The main block was demolished in 1925.

=== Pilkington European Technical Centre ===
Pilkington, the European Division of Nippon Sheet Glass Group, has its European Technical Centre in Lathom. The site was formerly the main R&D facility for Pilkington plc.

== Governance ==
Lathom was a township in the parish of Ormskirk in the West Derby hundred in south Lancashire. In 1837 Lathom became part of the Ormskirk Poor Law Union which took responsibility for administering the Poor Law in the area. The Lathom Sanitary District was formed in 1875 and Lathom became part of the Lathom and Burscough Urban District in 1894. In 1931 Lathom was incorporated into the Ormskirk Urban Uistrict which lasted until 1974.

== Geography ==
Lathom, which measured about six miles from north to south, covered an area of 8,694½ acres in west Lancashire. The River Tawd and Eller Brook flow through the township to join the River Douglas, which forms part of its northern boundary. Lathom House and park are between the brooks at the centre of the township. At the north of the township is Hoscar Moss which is less than 25 feet above sea level, to the south is New Park. To the west of the Eller Brook is Wirples Moss and in the south is the hamlet of Westhead, near Cross Hall. The main roads in the north pass west to east from Burscough to Newburgh, and in the south from Ormskirk to Dalton. There are roads leading north from Bickerstaffe and Skelmersdale.

To the west of the township the land is flat but to the east it rises to 215 feet above sea-level. To the south the land is flat and in the mid 19th century there were collieries. The geology of the western part of the township consists of the bunter series of the new red sandstone, with overlying beds of lower keuper sandstone, the eastern part lies on the Middle and Lower Coal Measures of the Lancashire Coalfield.

== Religion ==
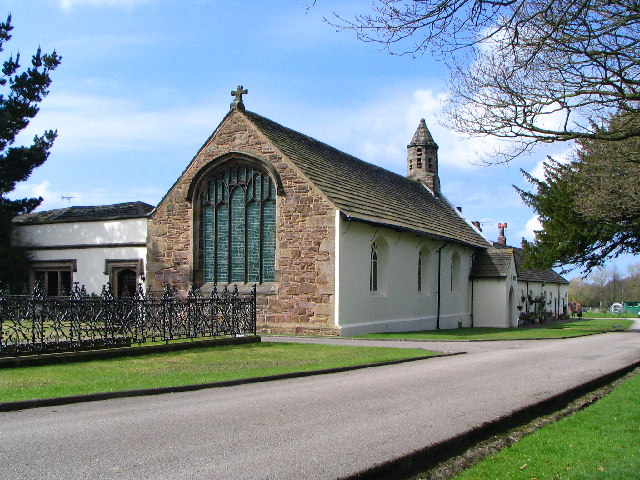
Lathom Park Chapel, founded by Thomas Stanley, 2nd Earl of Derby in 1500

Lathom Chapel is a plain rectangular building constructed in about 1500 and a chantry was founded there by the second earl. The chapel, dedicated to St John the Divine, was consecrated by the Bishop of Sodor and Man. The chapel was restored in 1810, at a cost of £1,200. A free school was built at the hamlet of Newburgh in 1714. The chapel holds regular Anglican services. Various plaques in the chapel commemorate the residents of Lathom Hall including the Bootle-Wilbraham.

== Transport ==
Lathom is also served by the railway station at Hoscar. The service run by Northern with good connections to Southport and Manchester, each having approximately one train every two hours.

== Notable people ==
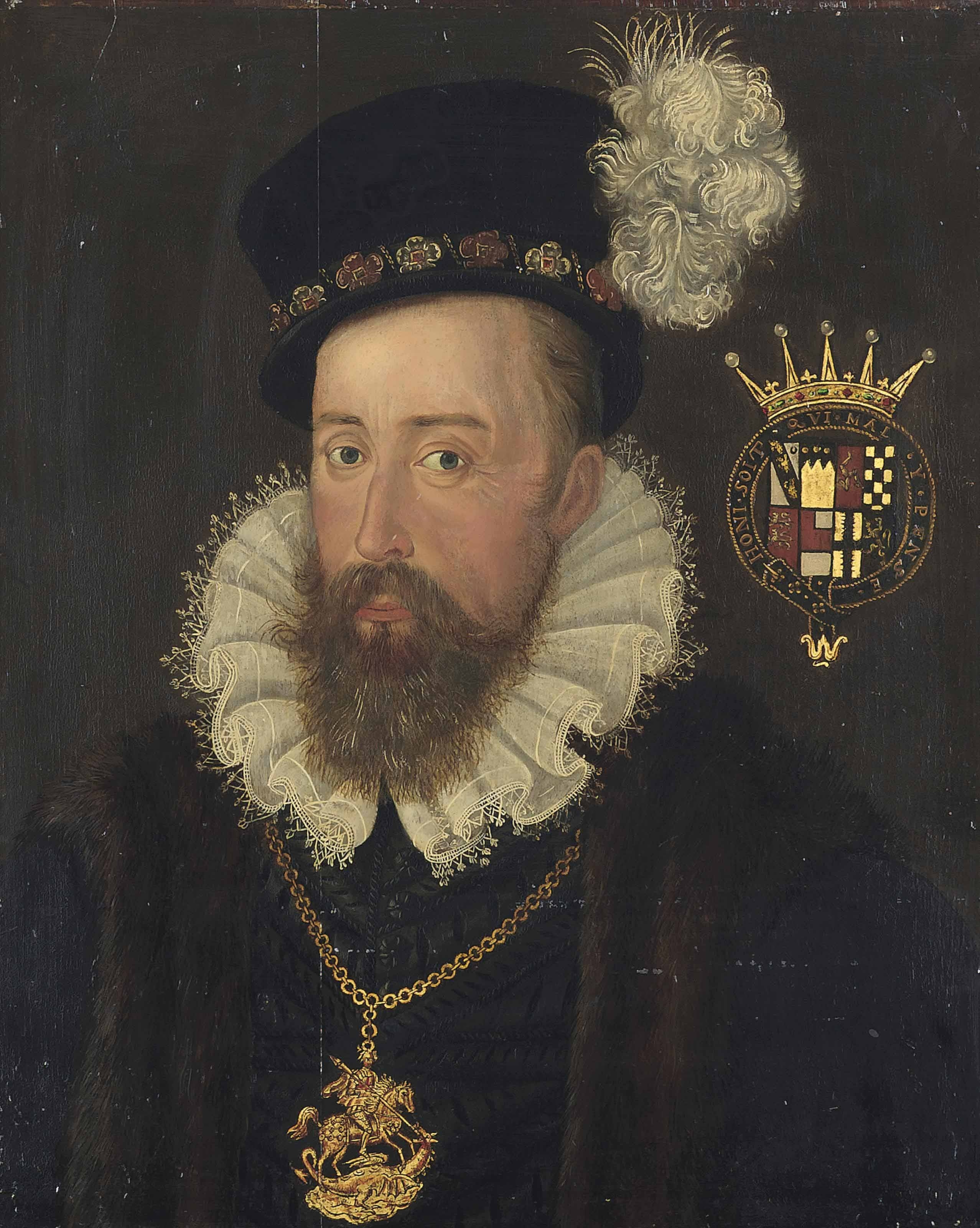
4th Earl of Derby, 16thC.

- Henry Stanley, 4th Earl of Derby (1531–1593), nobleman, diplomat and politician.
- Isaac Barrow (1613–1680), an English clergyman, was Bishop of Sodor and Man and Bishop of St Asaph
- Thomas Smoult (1631 or 1632 – 1707), the first Professor of Moral Theology or Casuistical Divinity in 1683 at the University of Cambridge
- Edward Bootle-Wilbraham, 1st Baron Skelmersdale (1771–1853), a British landowner and politician.
- Robert Bridge (1883–1953), a British racewalker who competed at the 1912 Summer Olympics

== See also ==
- Lathom South
- Listed buildings in Lathom
- Listed buildings in Lathom South
