= Russell House (Ottawa) =

Was the most high-profile hotel in Ottawa, Canada for many decades

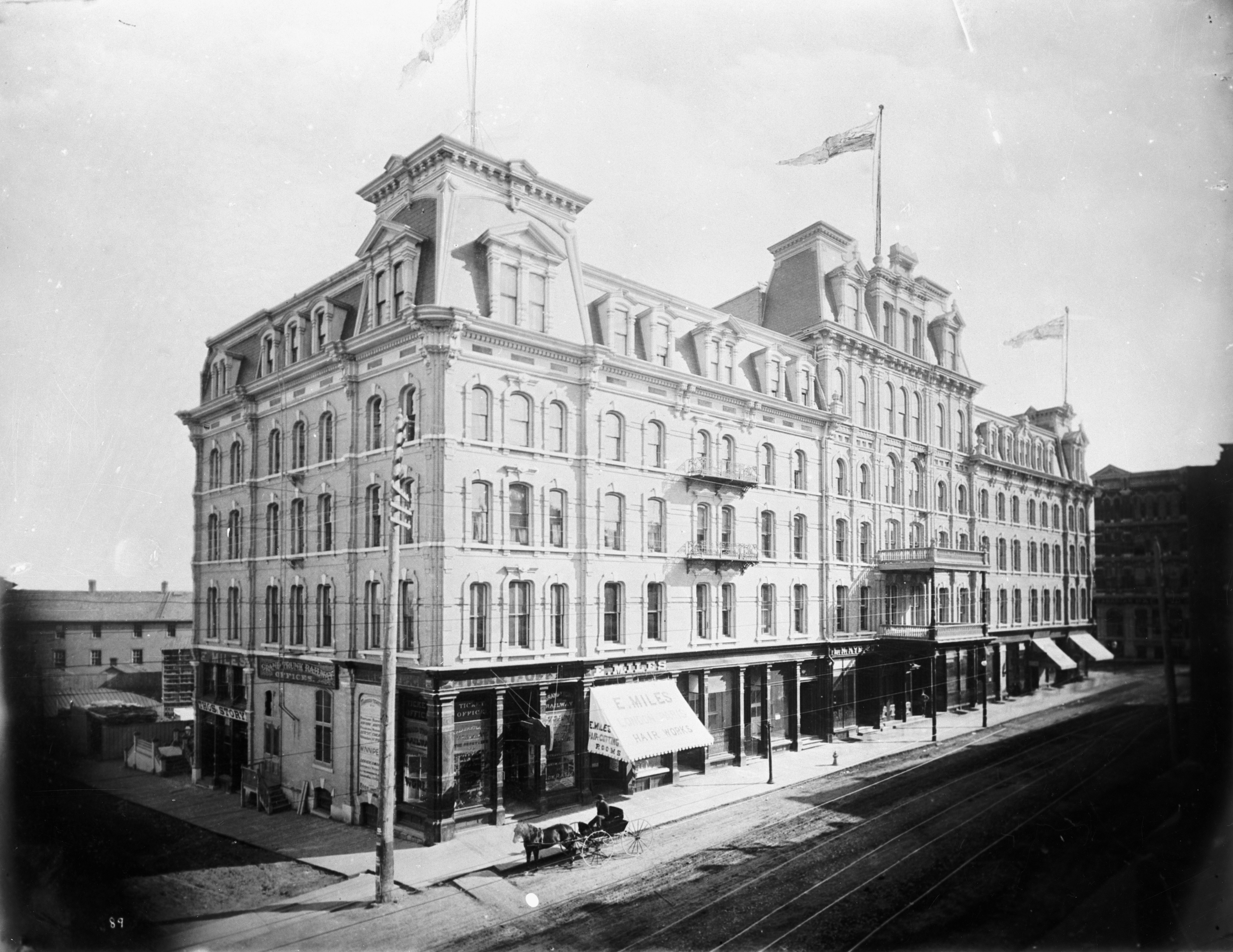
- The Russell House Hotel circa 1883
- Interactive map of the Russell House area

General information
- Status: Demolished
- Location: Ottawa, Ontario, Canada
- Coordinates: 45.4235°N 75.6953°W

Other information
- Number of rooms: 250
- Number of restaurants: 1

The Russell House hotel was the most high-profile hotel in Ottawa, Ontario, Canada, for many decades. It was located at the corner of Sparks Street and Elgin Street, where Confederation Square is located today. The original building was built in the 1840s. Additions were made in the 1870s and the original building replaced in 1880. It closed in 1925 and was demolished in 1928.

== History ==
The Second Empire hotel was located at the southeast corner of Sparks Street and Elgin Street. A small hotel was first built there in the 1840s and was named Campbell's Hotel after its proprietor. In 1863, it came under the ownership of James Gouin, who named it the Russell House after a family in the United States for whom he had managed a Quebec City hotel. Gouin later built the Caledonia Springs Hotel, a famous spa in eastern Ontario, and was appointed Ottawa Postmaster by Sir John A. Macdonald.

Ottawa's status as the capital of the new country created a pressing demand for hotel space. A new wing housing the dining room was built during the 1870s along Elgin Street. The original hotel was torn down and replaced in 1880, in the "Second Empire" style.

For many decades the Russell House served as Ottawa's foremost hotel. Most Canadian politicians from this era spent time at the Russell House, and Wilfrid Laurier lived there for ten years before moving to Laurier House. International guests included Oscar Wilde and Anna Pavlova.

On two occasions, important sport-related events occurred at the Russell House. In 1876, Ottawa's first rugby football team, the "Ottawas", was organized at Russell House, and played its first game three days later. The club would evolve to become the Ottawa Rough Riders football club. In 1892, at a dinner at the Russell House to honor the Ottawa Hockey Club, Governor-General Lord Stanley announced he would offer a trophy to the top Canadian ice hockey team, the genesis of the Stanley Cup.

In 1912, the Château Laurier succeeded the Russell as Ottawa's premier hotel. Money was spent on renovations in the 1920s, but the hotel had declined due to age and its closure was announced on September 1, 1925. Some of the reasons listed were the high cost of heating the structure, and the higher number of staff to operate the hotel, compared to a newer facility. The Russell House closed permanently on October 1, 1925. Ground-level shops remained open, but the hotel was emptied. On April 14, 1928, a fire broke out in the hotel, and the hotel was mostly destroyed. The remains of the structure were demolished by November. The Government of Canada had been in the process of buying the property when the fire occurred, and the government used the land to expand Elgin Street to create Confederation Square. Various artifacts of the hotel are on display at the Bytown Museum.

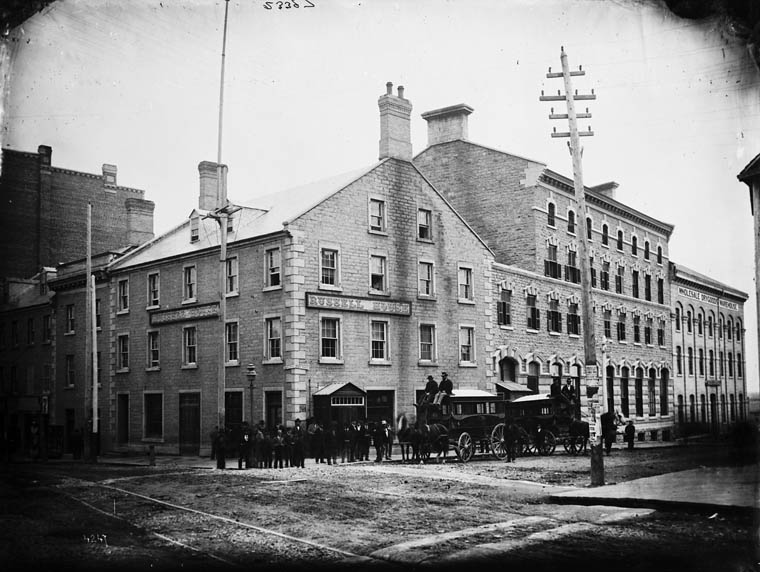
The original hotel with new wing on right

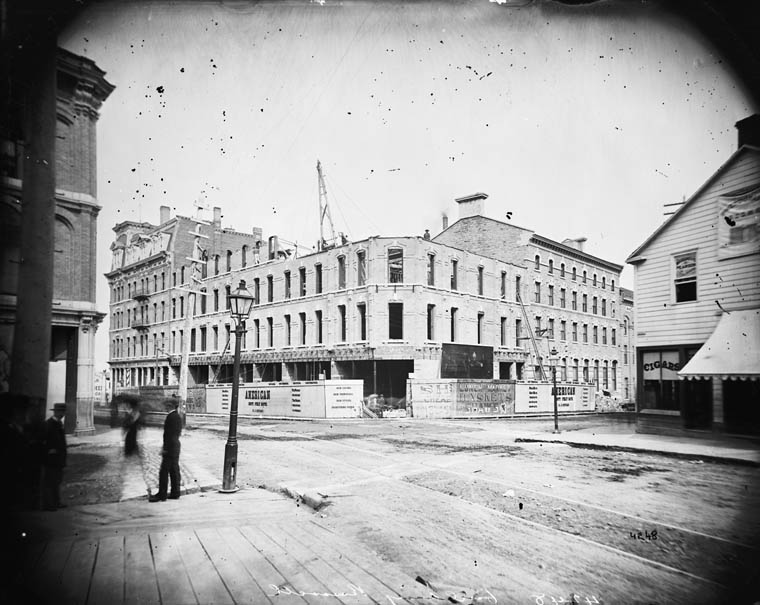
Construction of new main building in 1880

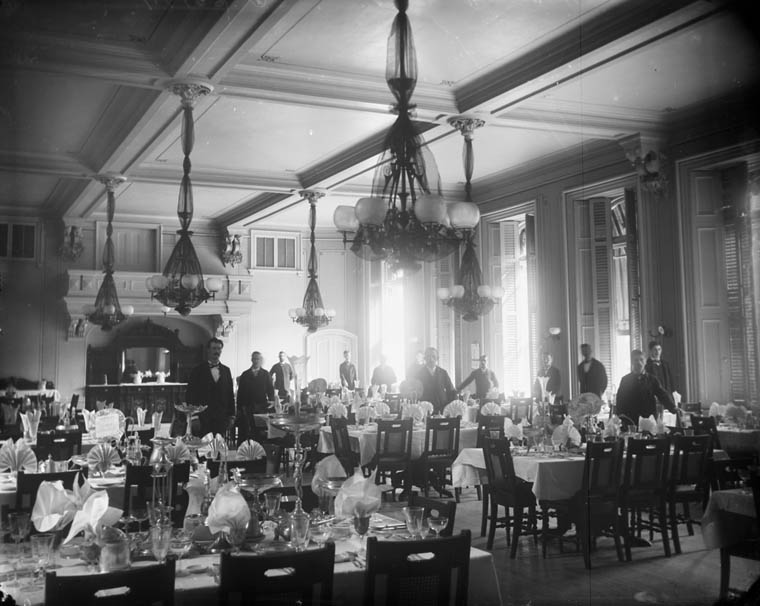
Dining room in 1884

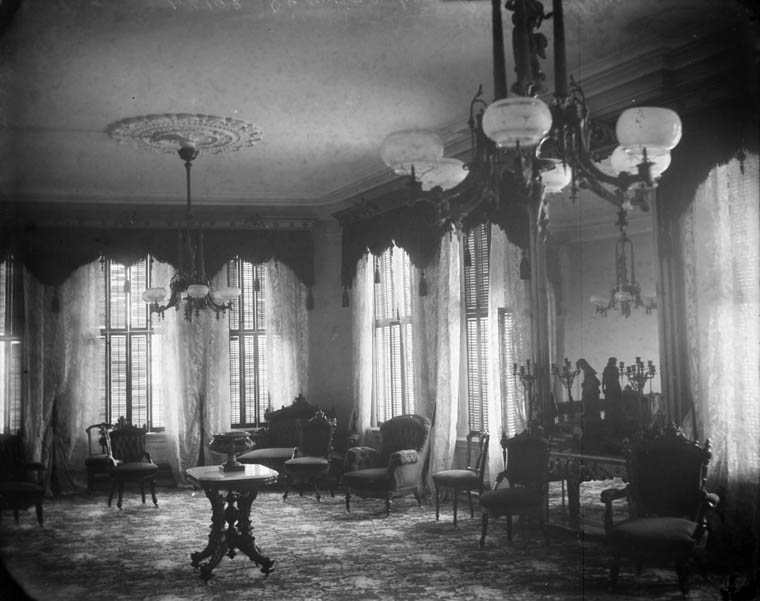
Drawing room in 1884

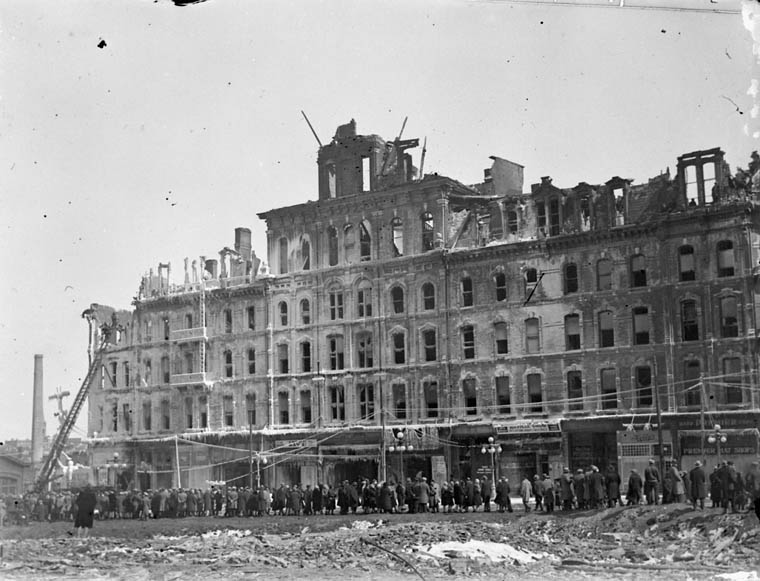
Ruins after fire in 1928

== See also ==
- Confederation Square, a square containing the War Memorial has historical information of the area with Russell Hotel highlights.
- Lord Stanley's Gift Monument, monument at Sparks and Elgin commemorating the donation of the Stanley Cup
