= Stanley Cup =

National Hockey League championship trophy

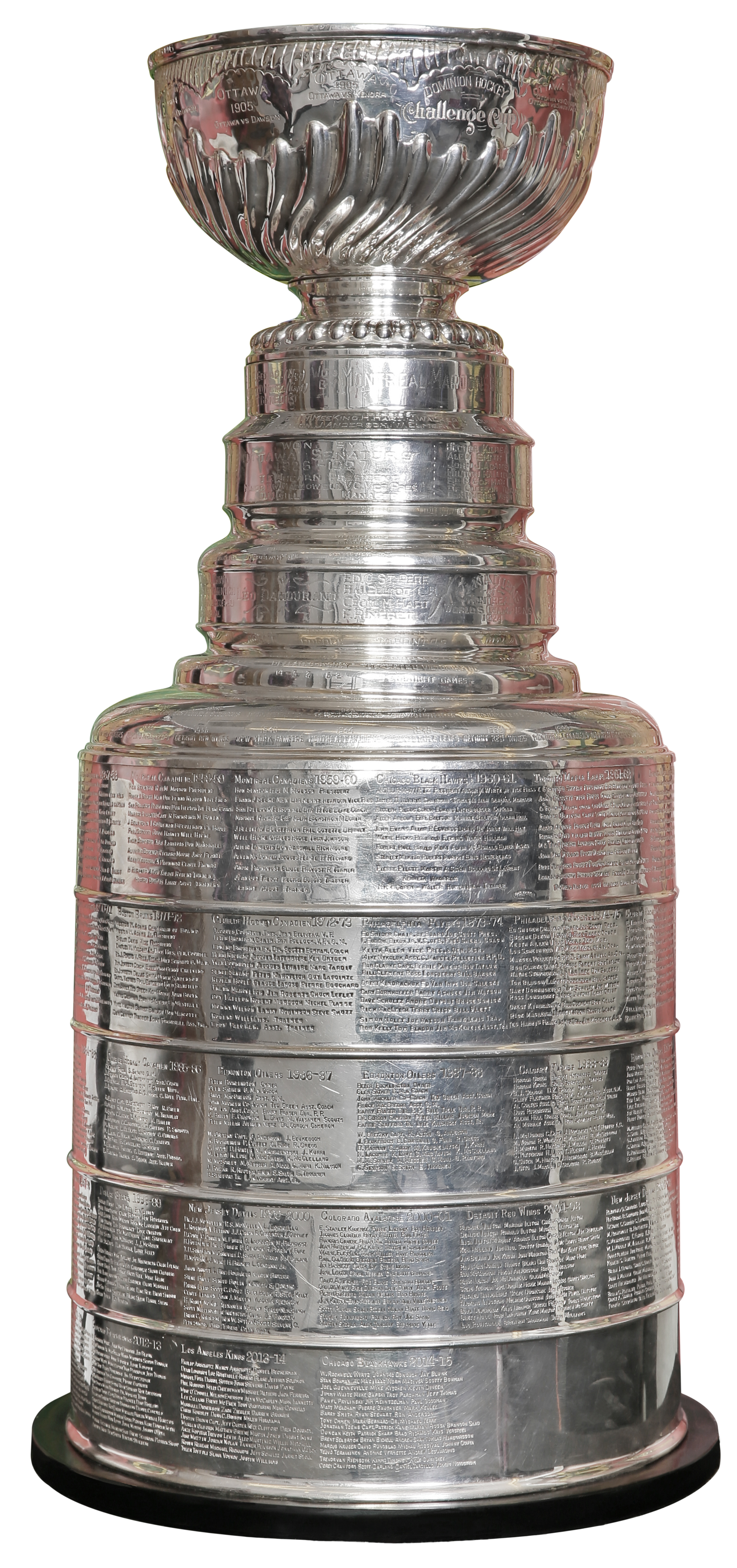
- Sport: Ice hockey
- Competition: Stanley Cup playoffs
- Awarded for: Playoff champion of the National Hockey League (NHL)

History
- First award: 1893
- First winner: Montreal Hockey Club (4) (AHAC)
- Most wins: Montreal Canadiens (24) (Note: The Montreal Canadiens won the Stanley Cup the first time as a member of the National Hockey Association, and the last 23 times as a member of the National Hockey League.)
- Most recent: Carolina Hurricanes (2)

The Stanley Cup (French: La Coupe Stanley) is the championship trophy awarded annually to the National Hockey League (NHL) playoff champion. It is the oldest existing trophy to be awarded to a professional sports franchise in North America, and the International Ice Hockey Federation (IIHF) considers it to be one of the "most important championships available to the sport". The trophy was commissioned in 1892 as the Dominion Hockey Challenge Cup and is named after Lord Stanley of Preston, the governor general of Canada, who donated it as an award to Canada's top-ranking amateur ice hockey club. The entire Stanley family supported the sport, the sons and daughters all playing and promoting the game. The first Cup was awarded in 1893 to the Montreal Hockey Club, and winners from 1893 to 1914 were determined by challenge games and league play. Professional teams first became eligible to challenge for the Stanley Cup in 1906. In 1915, the National Hockey Association (NHA) and the Pacific Coast Hockey Association (PCHA), the two main professional ice hockey organizations, reached an agreement in which their respective champions would face each other annually for the Stanley Cup. The PCHA's successor, the Western Hockey League, dissolved after the 1925–26 season, and no other leagues apart from the NHL were deemed worthy of challenging for the Cup, making it the de facto championship trophy of the NHL. It became the de jure NHL championship trophy in 1947.

There are actually three Stanley Cups: the original bowl of the "Dominion Hockey Challenge Cup", the authenticated "Presentation Cup", and the spelling-corrected "Permanent Cup" on display at the Hockey Hall of Fame whenever the Presentation Cup is not available. While the NHL has maintained control over the trophy itself and its associated trademarks, the NHL does not actually own the trophy but uses it by agreement with the two Canadian trustees of the Cup. The NHL has registered trademarks associated with the name and likeness of the Stanley Cup, although there has been dispute as to whether the league has the right to own trademarks associated with a trophy that it does not own.

The original bowl was made of silver and is 18.5 centimetres (7 5/16 in) high and 29 centimetres (11 7/16 in) in diameter. The current Stanley Cup is topped with a copy of the original bowl, made of a silver and nickel alloy. It has a height of 89.5 centimetres (35 1/4 in) and weighs 15.6 kilograms (34 1/2 lb). Like the Grey Cup, and unlike the trophies awarded by the other major professional sports leagues of North America, a new Stanley Cup is not made every year. The winners originally kept it until a new champion was crowned, but winning teams currently get the Stanley Cup during the summer and a limited number of days during the season. Every year since 1924, a select portion of the winning players, coaches, management, and club staff names are engraved on its bands, which is unusual among trophies. However, there is not enough room to include all the players and non-players, so some names must be omitted. Between 1924 and 1940, a new band was added almost every year that the trophy was awarded, earning the nickname "Stovepipe Cup" due to the unnatural height of all the bands. In 1947, the cup size was reduced, but not all the large rings were the same size. In 1958, the modern one-piece Cup was designed with a five-band barrel which could contain 13 winning teams per band. Every 13 years when the bottom band of the Stanley Cup is filled with names of champions, the top band is removed and retired to be displayed in the vault of the Hockey Hall of Fame in Toronto. The four bands below it are slid up one place and a new blank band added to the bottom. The first winning team engraved on the newest band is thus, in theory (see Engraving section below), displayed on the trophy for the next 65 years. It has been referred to as The Cup, Lord Stanley's Cup, The Holy Grail, or facetiously as Lord Stanley's Mug. The Stanley Cup is surrounded by numerous legends and traditions, the oldest of which is the winning team drinking champagne from it.

Since the 1914–15 season, the Cup has been won a combined 106 times by 21 current NHL teams and five teams no longer in existence. It was not awarded in 1919 because of the Spanish flu epidemic and in 2005 because of the 2004–05 NHL lockout. It was held by nine different teams between 1893 and 1914. The Montreal Canadiens have won it a record 24 times and are the most recent Canadian-based team to win it, doing so in 1993; the Detroit Red Wings have won it 11 times, the most of any United States–based NHL team, most recently in 2008. The current holders of the Cup are the Carolina Hurricanes after their victory in 2026, their second in franchise history.

== History ==
=== Origins ===
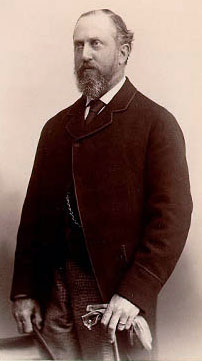
Lord Stanley of Preston

After Frederick Stanley, 1st Baron Stanley of Preston (later the 16th Earl of Derby) was appointed by Queen Victoria as governor general of Canada on June 11, 1888, he and his family became highly enthusiastic about ice hockey. Stanley was first exposed to the game at Montreal's 1889 Winter Carnival, where he saw the Montreal Victorias play the Montreal Hockey Club. The Montreal Gazette reported that he "expressed his great delight with the game of hockey and the expertise of the players". During that time, organized ice hockey in Canada was still in its infancy and only Montreal and Ottawa had anything resembling leagues.

Stanley's entire family became active in ice hockey. Two of his sons, Arthur and Algernon, formed a new team called the Ottawa Rideau Hall Rebels. Arthur also played a key role in the formation of what later became known as the Ontario Hockey Association (OHA), and became the founder of ice hockey in Great Britain. Arthur and Algernon persuaded their father to donate a trophy to be "an outward and visible sign of the hockey championship". Stanley sent the following message to the victory celebration held on March 18, 1892, at Ottawa's Russell House Hotel for the three-time champion Ottawa Hockey Club:

I have for some time been thinking that it would be a good thing if there were a challenge cup which should be held from year to year by the champion hockey team in the Dominion [of Canada].

There does not appear to be any such outward sign of a championship at present, and considering the general interest which matches now elicit, and the importance of having the game played fairly and under rules generally recognized, I am willing to give a cup which shall be held from year to year by the winning team.

I am not quite certain that the present regulations governing the arrangement of matches give entire satisfaction, and it would be worth considering whether they could not be arranged so that each team would play once at home and once at the place where their opponents hail from.

Soon afterwards, Stanley purchased what is frequently described as a decorative punch bowl, but which silver expert John Culme identified as a rose bowl, made in Sheffield, England, and sold by London silversmith G. R. Collis and Company (now Boodle and Dunthorne Jewellers), for ten guineas, equal to ten and a half pounds sterling, US$48.67, which is equal to $1,744 in 2025 dollars. He had the words "Dominion Hockey Challenge Cup" engraved on one side of the outside rim, and "From Stanley of Preston" on the other side. The name "Stanley Cup" was given to it as early as May 1, 1893, when an Ottawa Journal article used the name as a title.

Originally, Stanley intended that the Cup should be awarded to the top amateur hockey team in Canada, to be decided by the acceptance of a challenge from another team. He made five preliminary regulations:

1. The winners shall return the Cup in good order when required by the trustees so that it may be handed over to any other team which may win it.
2. Each winning team, at its own expense, may have the club name and year engraved on a silver ring fitted on the Cup.
3. The Cup shall remain a challenge cup, and should not become the property of one team, even if won more than once.
4. The trustees shall maintain absolute authority in all situations or disputes over the winner of the Cup.
5. If one of the existing trustees resigns or drops out, the remaining trustee shall nominate a substitute.

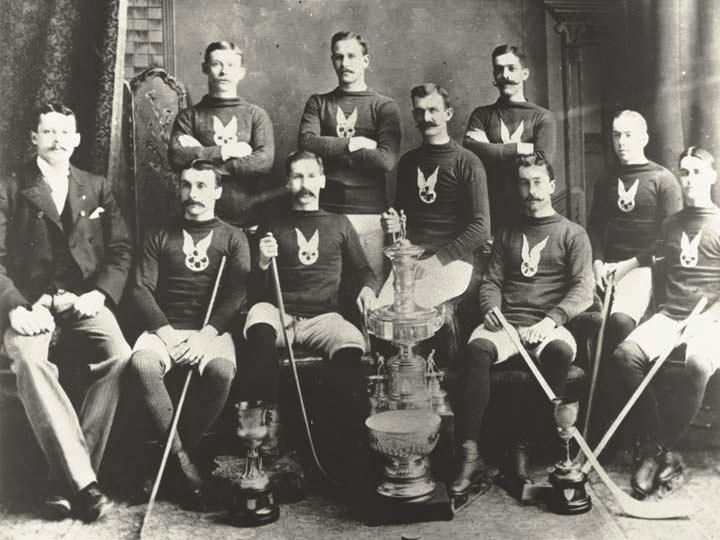
The first Stanley Cup Champions were the Montreal Hockey Club (affiliated with the Montreal Amateur Athletic Association).

Stanley appointed Sheriff John Sweetland and Philip D. Ross (who went on to serve an unsurpassed 56 years) as trustees of the Cup. Sweetland and Ross first presented the trophy in 1893 to the Montreal Amateur Athletic Association on behalf of the affiliated Montreal Hockey Club, the champions of the Amateur Hockey Association of Canada (AHAC), since they "defeated all comers during the late season, including the champions of the Ontario Association" (Ottawa). Sweetland and Ross also believed that the AHAC was the top league, and as first-place finishers in the AHAC, Montreal was the best team in Canada. Naturally, the Ottawas were upset by the decision because there had been no challenge games scheduled and because the trustees failed to convey the rules on how the Cup was to be awarded prior to the start of the season.

As a result, the Cup trustees issued more specific rules on how the trophy should be defended and awarded:

- The Cup is automatically awarded to the team that wins the title of the previous Cup champion's league, without the need for any other special extra contest.
- Challengers for the Cup must be from senior hockey associations, and must have won their league championship. Challengers will be recognized in the order in which their request is received.
- The challenge games (where the Cup could change leagues) are to be decided either in a one-game affair, a two-game total goals affair, or a best of three series, to the benefit of both teams involved. All matches are to take place on the home ice of the champions, although specific dates and times have to be approved by the trustees.
- Ticket receipts from the challenge games are to be split equally between both teams.
- If the two competing clubs cannot agree to a referee, the trustees will appoint one, and the two teams shall cover the expenses equally.
- A league could not challenge for the Cup twice in one season.

Lord Stanley never saw a Stanley Cup championship game, nor did he ever present the Cup. Although his term as Governor General ended in September 1893, he was forced to return to England on July 15. In April of that year, his older brother Edward Stanley, 15th Earl of Derby died without issue, and Stanley succeeded him as the 16th Earl of Derby.

=== Challenge Cup era ===
During the challenge cup period, none of the leagues that played for the trophy had a formal playoff system to decide their respective champions; whichever team finished in first place after the regular season won the league title. However, in 1894, four teams out of the five-team AHAC tied for the championship with records of 5–3–0. The AHAC had no tie-breaking system. After extensive negotiations and Quebec's withdrawal from the championship competition, it was decided that a three-team tournament would take place in Montreal, with the Ottawa team receiving a bye to the final because they were the only road team. On March 17, in the first Stanley Cup playoff game, the Montreal Hockey Club (Montreal HC) defeated the Montreal Victorias, 3–2. Five days later, in the first Stanley Cup Final game, Montreal HC beat the Ottawa Hockey Club 3–1.

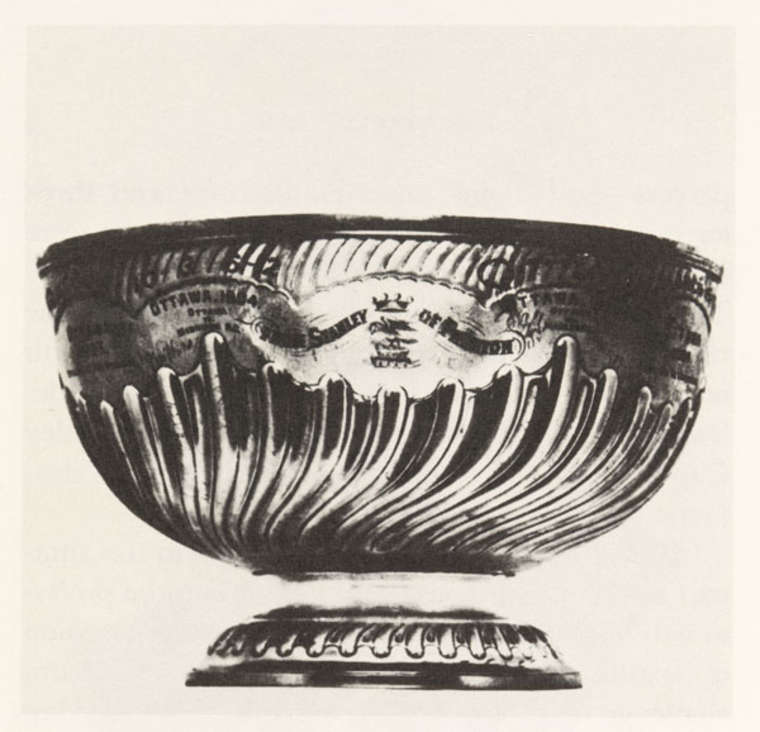
The first Stanley Cup

In 1895, Queen's University was the first official challenger for the Cup, although it was controversial. The Montreal Victorias had won the league title and thus the Stanley Cup, but the challenge match was between the previous year's champion, Montreal HC, and the university squad. The trustees decided that if the Montreal HC won the challenge match, the Victorias would become the Stanley Cup champions. The Montreal HC won the match 5–1 and their cross-town rivals were crowned the champions. The first successful challenge to the Cup came the next year by the Winnipeg Victorias, the champions of the Manitoba Hockey League. On February 14, 1896, the Winnipeg squad defeated the champions 2–0 and became the first team outside the AHAC to win the Cup.

As the prestige of winning the Cup grew, so did the need to attract top players. Only nine months after winning the Cup, in March 1906, the Montreal Wanderers pushed through a resolution at the annual meeting of the Eastern Canada Amateur Hockey Association (ECAHA) to allow professional players to play alongside amateurs. The Cup trustees agreed to open the challenges to professional teams, because the ECAHA was the top hockey league in Canada at the time. The first professional competition came one month later during the Wanderers' two-game, total goals challenge series, which they won 17 goals to 5.

The smallest municipality to produce a Stanley Cup champion team is Kenora, Ontario; the town had a population of about 4,000 when the Kenora Thistles captured the Cup in January 1907. Led by future Hall of Famers Art Ross and "Bad" Joe Hall, the Thistles defeated the Montreal Wanderers in a two-game, total goals challenge series. The Thistles successfully defended the Cup once, against a team from Brandon, Manitoba. In March 1907, the Wanderers challenged the Thistles to a rematch. Despite an improved lineup, the Thistles lost the Cup to Montreal.

In 1908, the Allan Cup was introduced as the trophy for Canada's amateurs, and the Stanley Cup started to become a symbol of professional hockey supremacy. In that same year, the first all-professional team, the Toronto Trolley Leaguers from the newly created Ontario Professional Hockey League (OPHL), competed for the Cup. One year later, the Montreal HC and the Montreal Victorias, the two remaining amateur teams, left the ECAHA, and the ECAHA dropped "Amateur" from their name to become a professional league. In 1910, the National Hockey Association (NHA) was formed. The NHA soon proved it was the best in Canada, as it kept the Cup for the next four years.

Prior to 1912, challenges could take place at any time or place, given the appropriate rink conditions, and it was common for teams to defend the Cup numerous times during the year. In 1912, Cup trustees declared that it was to be defended only at the end of the champion team's regular season.

=== Organized interleague competition ===
In 1914, the Victoria Aristocrats from the Pacific Coast Hockey Association (PCHA) challenged the NHA and Cup champion Toronto Blueshirts. A controversy erupted when a letter arrived from the Stanley Cup trustees on March 17, that the trustees would not let the Stanley Cup travel west, as they did not consider Victoria a proper challenger because they had not formally notified the trustees. However, on March 18, Trustee William Foran stated that it was a misunderstanding. PCHA president Frank Patrick had not filed a challenge, because he had expected Emmett Quinn of the NHA to make all of the arrangements in his role as hockey commissioner, whereas the trustees thought they were being deliberately ignored. In any case, all arrangements had been ironed out and the Victoria challenge was accepted.

Several days later, trustee Foran wrote to NHA president Quinn that the trustees are "perfectly satisfied to allow the representatives of the three pro leagues (NHA, PCHA, and Maritime) to make all arrangements each season as to the series of matches to be played for the Cup". One year later, when the Maritime league folded, the NHA and the PCHA concluded a gentlemen's agreement in which their respective champions would face each other for the Cup, similar to baseball's World Series, which is played between the American League and National League champions. Under the new proposal, the Stanley Cup Final series alternated between the East and the West each year, with alternating games played according to NHA and PCHA rules. The PCHA's Vancouver Millionaires won the 1915 series three games to none in a best-of-five series.

Prior to organized ice hockey expanding to any serious extent outside Canada, the concept that the Stanley Cup champion ought to be recognized as the world champion was already firmly established – Stanley Cup winners were claiming the title of world champions by no later than the turn of the century. After the Portland Rosebuds, an American-based team, joined the PCHA in 1914, the trustees promptly issued a formal statement that the Cup was no longer for the best team in Canada, but now for the best team in the world. Ice hockey in Europe was still in its infancy at this time, so it was without much controversy that winners of the Stanley Cup continued styling themselves as the world champions just like in baseball. Two years later, the Rosebuds became the first American-based team to play in the Stanley Cup Final, although all its players were Canadian. In 1917, the Seattle Metropolitans became the first American-based team to win the Cup. After that season, the NHA dissolved, and the National Hockey League (NHL) took its place.

The Spanish influenza epidemic forced the Montreal Canadiens and the Seattle Metropolitans to cancel the 1919 Stanley Cup Final after game five, marking the first time the Stanley Cup was not awarded. The series was tied at 2–2–1, but the final game was never played because Montreal Manager George Kennedy and players Joe Hall, Billy Coutu, Jack McDonald, and Newsy Lalonde were hospitalized with influenza. Hall died four days after the cancelled game, and the series was abandoned.

The format for the Stanley Cup Final changed in 1922, with the creation of the Western Canada Hockey League (WCHL). Three leagues competed for the Cup: two league champions faced each other for the right to challenge the third champion in the final series. This lasted three seasons as the PCHA and the WCHL later merged to form the Western Hockey League (WHL) in 1925. In 1924–25 the Victoria Cougars won the Cup, the last team outside the NHL to do so.

=== NHL takes over ===
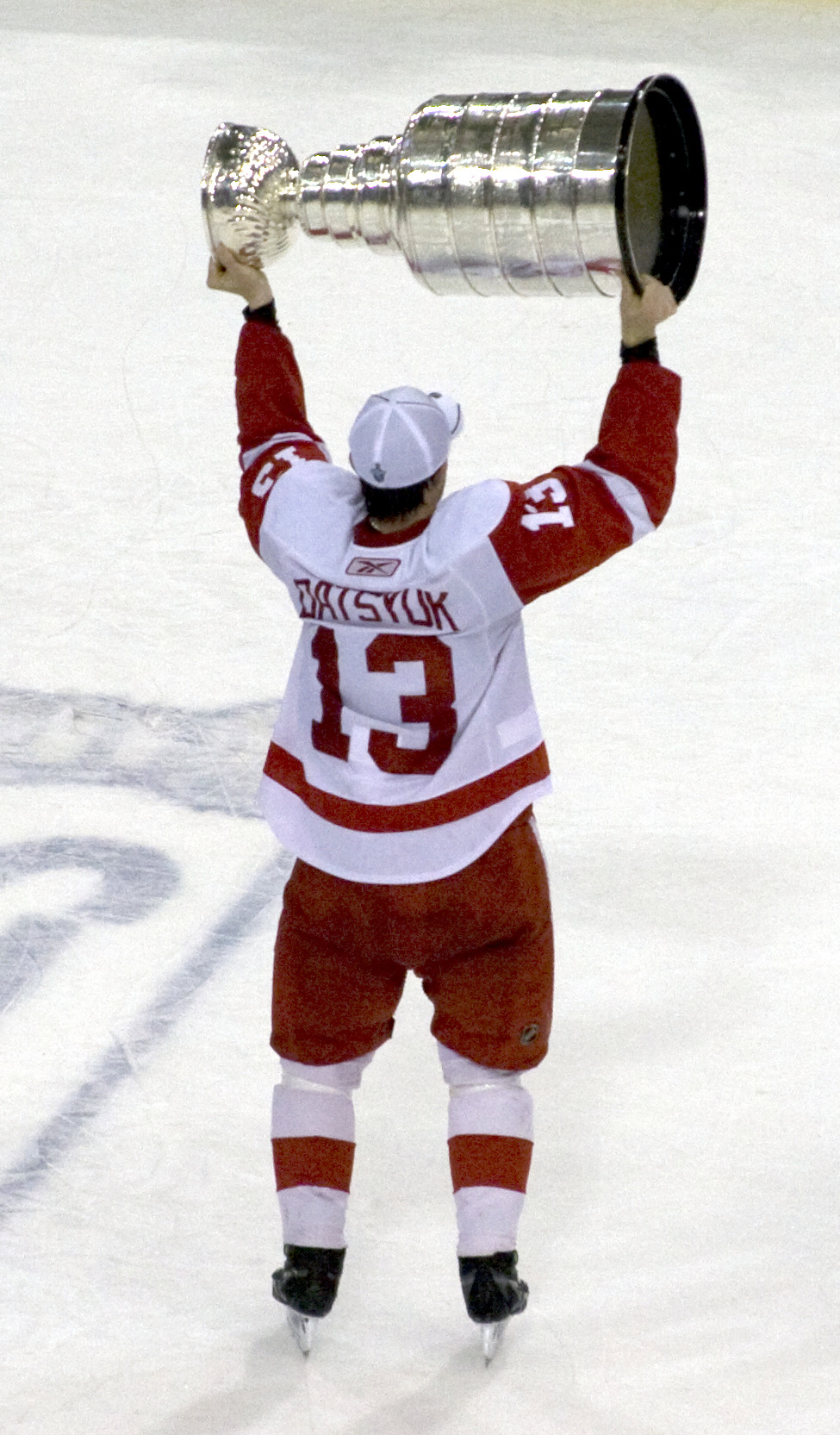
After winning the Cup, players traditionally skate around holding the trophy above their heads, as Pavel Datsyuk of the Detroit Red Wings does here when the Red Wings won the Cup for the 11th time in 2008.

The WHL folded in 1926 and was quickly replaced by the Prairie Hockey League. However, in the meantime, the NHL (which had entered the U.S. only two years before) bought up the contracts of most of the WHL's players and largely used them to stock the rosters of three new U.S. teams. In what would turn out to be its most significant expansion of its pre-Original Six era, the Chicago Black Hawks, Detroit Cougars (now called the Detroit Red Wings), and New York Rangers joined the NHL. With the NHL now firmly established in the largest markets of the northeastern United States, and with the western teams having been stripped of their best players, the PHL was deemed to be a "minor league" unworthy of challenging the NHL for hockey supremacy.

The PHL lasted only two seasons. Over the next two decades other leagues and clubs occasionally issued challenges, but none were accepted by the Cup's trustees. Since 1926, no non-NHL team has played for the Cup, leading it to become the de facto championship trophy of the NHL. In addition, with no major professional hockey league left to challenge it, the NHL began calling its league champions the world champions, notwithstanding the lack of any interleague championship. In doing so, the NHL copied a policy that had been adopted by the then still-fledgling National Football League from its start in 1920 (and which the National Basketball Association also asserted upon its founding in 1946).

Finally in 1947, the NHL reached an agreement with trustee and former NHL referee J. Cooper Smeaton to grant control of the Cup to the NHL, allowing the league to unilaterally reject challenges from other leagues that may have wished to play for the Cup:

1. The Trustees hereby delegate to the League full authority to determine and amend from time to time the conditions for competition of the Stanley Cup, including the qualifications of challengers, the appointment of officials, the apportionment and distribution of all gate receipts, provided always that the winners of this trophy shall be the acknowledged World's Professional Hockey Champions.
2. The Trustees agree that during the currency of this agreement they will not acknowledge or accept any challenge for the Stanley Cup unless such a challenge is in conformity with the condition specified in paragraph one (1) thereof.
3. The League undertakes the responsibility for the care and safe custody of the Stanley Cup including all necessary repairs and alterations to the cup and sub-structure as may be required from time to time, and further undertakes to ensure the Stanley Cup for its full insurable value.
4. The League hereby acknowledges itself to be bound to the Trustees in the sum of One Thousand Dollars, which bond is conditioned upon the safe return of the Stanley Cup to the Trustees in accordance with the terms of this Agreement, and it is agreed that the League shall have the right to return the trophy to the Trustees at any time.
5. This agreement shall remain in force so long as the League continues to be the world's leading professional hockey league as determined by its playing caliber and in the event of dissolution or other termination of the National Hockey League, the Stanley Cup shall revert to the custody of the trustees.
6. In the event of default in the appointment of a new trustee by the surviving trustee, the "Trustees" hereby delegate and appoint the Governors of the International Hockey Hall of Fame in Kingston, Ontario, to name two Canadian trustees to carry on under the terms of the original trust, and in conformity with this Agreement.
7. And it is further mutually agreed that any disputes arising as to the interpretation of this Agreement or the facts upon which such interpretation is made, shall be settled by an Arbitration Board of three, one member to be appointed by each of the parties, and the third to be selected by the two appointees. The decision of the Arbitration Board shall be final.

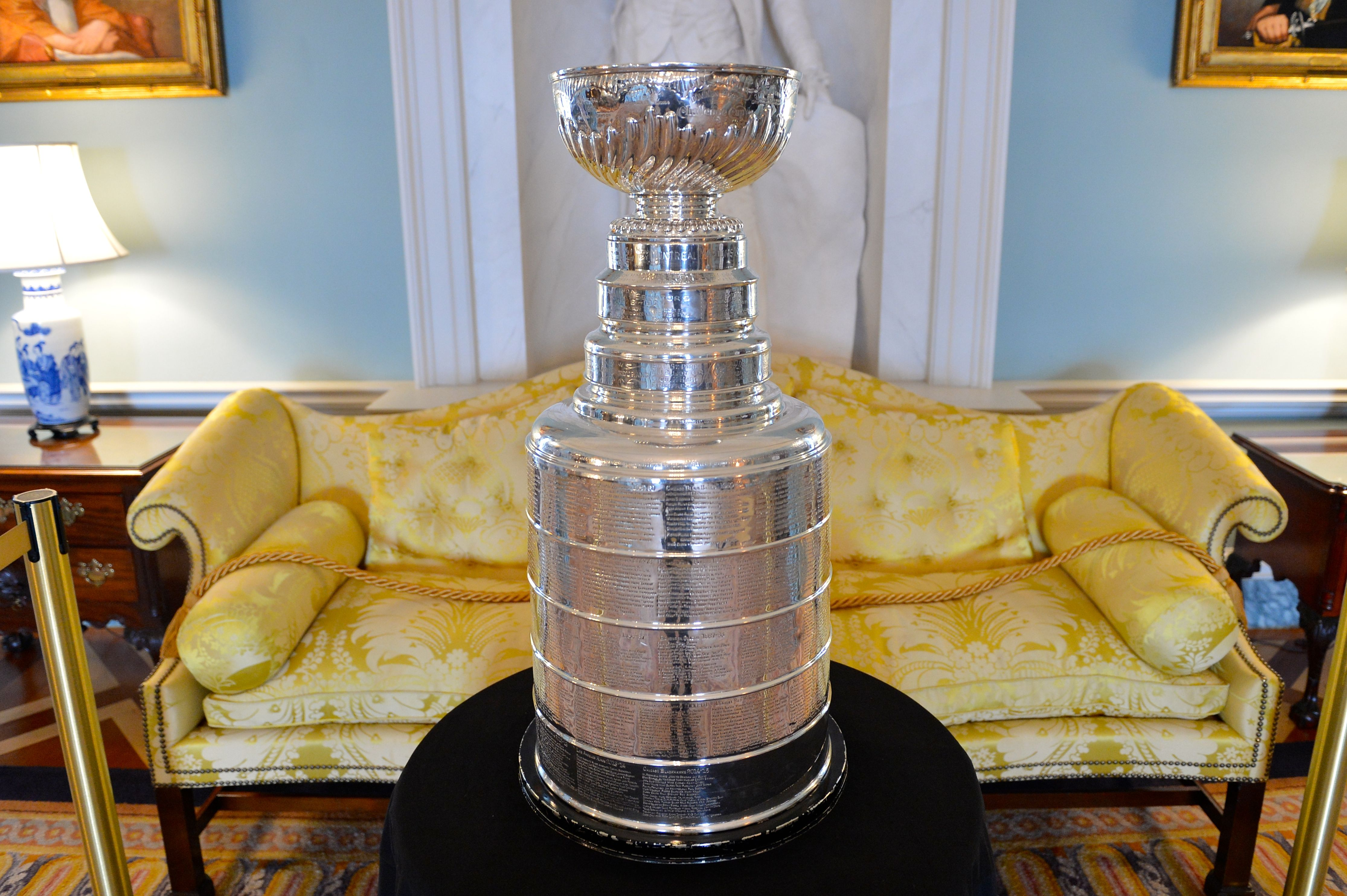
The Cup at a state luncheon at the United States Department of State in 2016.

The Cup was awarded every year until 2005, when a labour dispute between the NHL's owners and the NHL Players Association (the union that represents the players) led to the cancellation of the 2004–05 season. As a result, no Cup champion was crowned for the first time since the flu pandemic in 1919. The lockout was controversial among many fans, who questioned whether the NHL had exclusive control over the Cup. A website known as freestanley.com (since closed) was launched, asking fans to write to the Cup trustees and urge them to return to the original Challenge Cup format. Adrienne Clarkson, then governor general of Canada, alternately proposed that the Cup be presented to the top women's hockey team in lieu of the NHL season. This idea was so unpopular that the Clarkson Cup was created instead. Meanwhile, a group in Ontario, also known as the "Wednesday Nighters", filed an application with the Ontario Superior Court, claiming that the Cup trustees had overstepped their bounds in signing the 1947 agreement with the NHL, and therefore must award the trophy regardless of the lockout.

On February 7, 2006, a settlement was reached in which the trophy could be awarded to non-NHL teams should the league not operate for a season. The dispute lasted so long that, by the time it was settled, the NHL had resumed operating for the 2005–06 season, and the Stanley Cup went unclaimed for the 2004–05 season. Furthermore, when another NHL lockout commenced in 2012 the trustees stated that the 2006 agreement did not oblige them to award the Cup in the event of a lost season, and that they were likely to reject any non-NHL challenges for the Cup in the event the 2012–13 season were cancelled, which it was not.

In 2007, the International Ice Hockey Federation (IIHF) formalized the "Triple Gold Club", the group of players and coaches who have won an Olympic Games gold medal, a World Championship gold medal, and the Stanley Cup. The term had first entered popular use following the 2002 Winter Olympics, which saw the addition of the first Canadian members.

Since the NHL took over the Cup, the latest in the calendar year the Cup has been awarded was in late June. However, due to the COVID-19 pandemic, the 2019–20 season was paused with less than a month in the regular season. In July, 2020, the NHL implemented their Return to Play plan with an expanded playoffs, having 24 teams play instead of the usual 16. The Cup was awarded to the Tampa Bay Lightning on September 28. The next season, the Cup was awarded July 7, 2021, leaving only August, October, and November as the only months the Cup that have not been awarded.

=== 125th anniversary ===
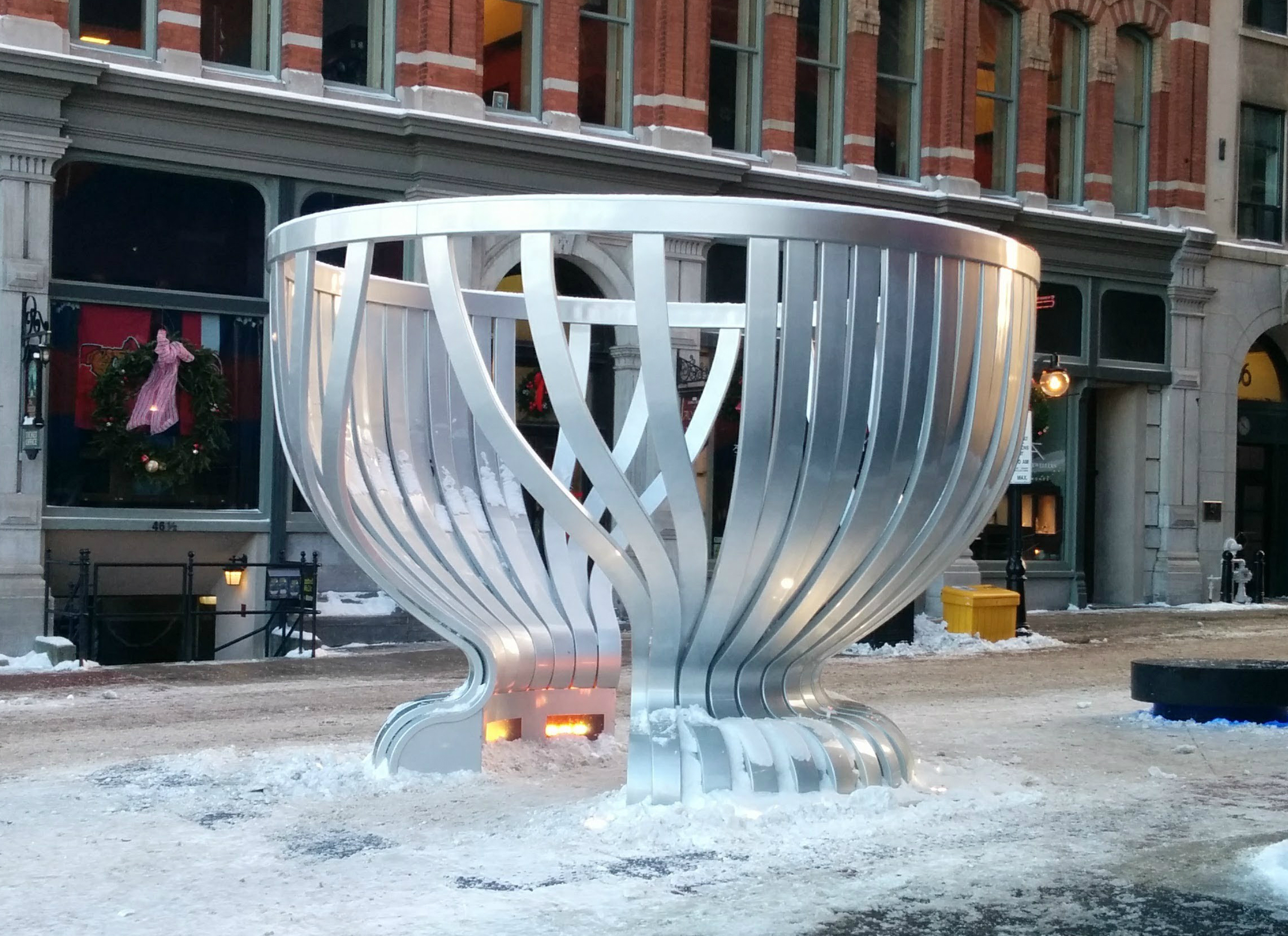
Lord Stanley's Gift Monument

In March 2017, to commemorate the Stanley Cup's 125th anniversary, the original Cup and the current Stanley Cup were the focus of a four-day tour of Ottawa, including a stop at Rideau Hall. The Royal Canadian Mint produced two commemorative coins to mark the anniversary. The first is a roll of Canadian quarters with an image of the Stanley Cup, the word Stanley Cup in English and Coupe Stanley in French with two ice hockey players and "125 years/ans" on the reverse and an effigy of Queen Elizabeth II on the obverse using plated steel. The second coin was designed with the Stanley Cup on the reverse and an effigy of Elizabeth II, "Stanley Cup" in English and "Coupe Stanley" in French and "50 dollars" above the effigy. It was made using 99.9% silver.

In October 2017, the Lord Stanley's Gift Monument, commemorating the donation of the Stanley Cup, was erected in Ottawa at Sparks Street and Elgin Street, near the location of the dinner party announcing the Cup at the Russell House, which has since been demolished.

== Engraving ==
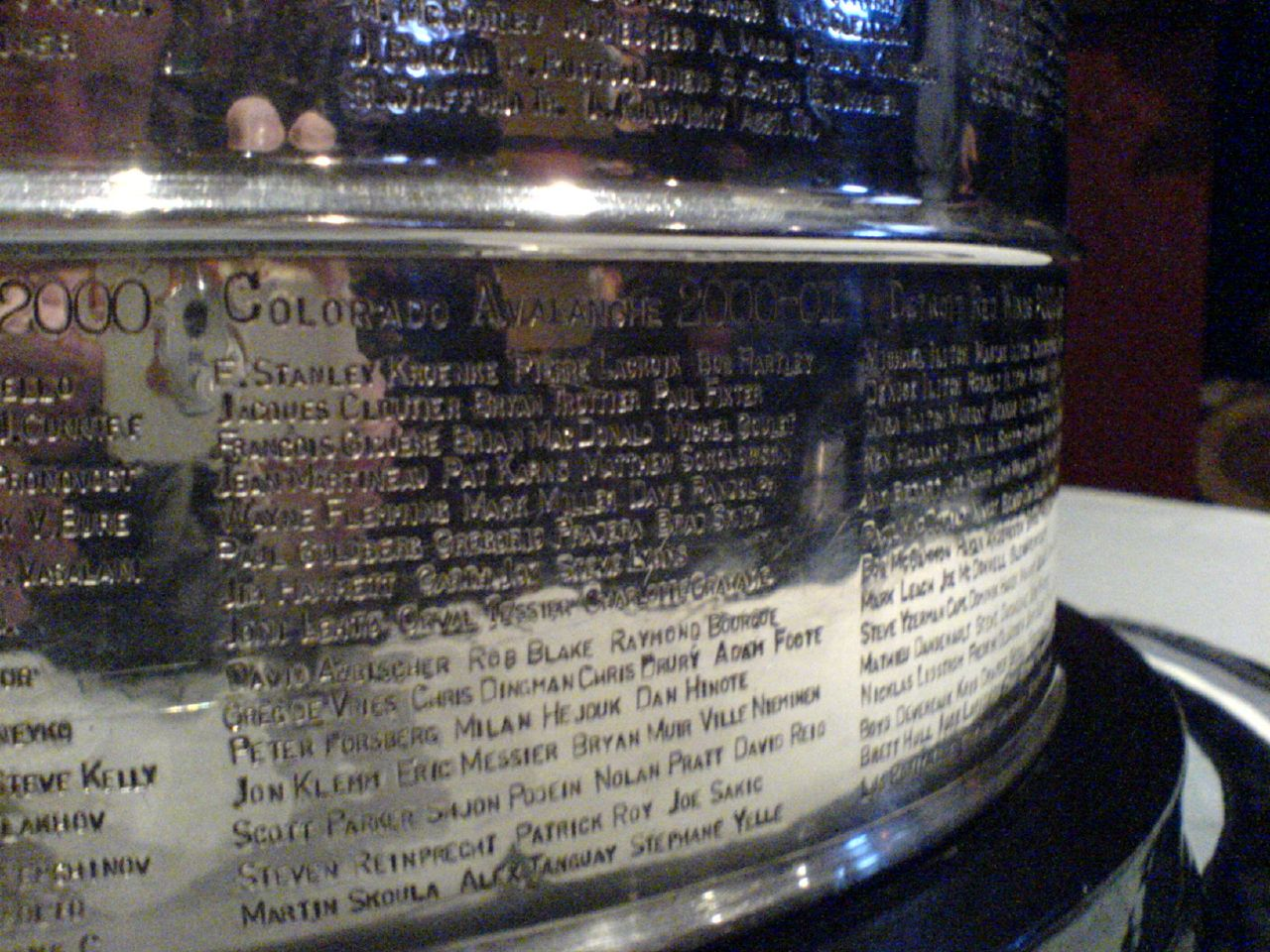
A close-up view of the engraving for the 2001 champion Colorado Avalanche

Like the Grey Cup, awarded to the winner of the Canadian Football League, the Stanley Cup is engraved with the names of the winning players, coaches, management, and club staff. However, this was not always the case: one of Lord Stanley's original conditions was that each team could, at their own expense, add a ring to the Cup to commemorate their victory. Initially, there was only one base ring, which was attached to the bottom of the original bowl by the Montreal Hockey Club. Clubs engraved their team names, usually in the form "TEAM NAME" "YEAR WON", on that one ring until it was full in 1902. With no more room to engrave their names (and unwilling to pay for a second band), teams left their mark on the bowl itself. The 1907 Montreal Wanderers became the first club to record their name on the bowl's interior surface, and the first champion to record the names of 20 members of their team.

In 1908, for reasons unknown, the Wanderers, despite having turned aside four challengers, did not record their names on the Cup. The next year, the Ottawa Senators added a second band onto the Cup. Despite the new room, the 1910 Wanderers and the 1911 Senators did not put their names on the Cup. The 1915 Vancouver Millionaires became the second team to engrave players' names, this time inside the bowl along its sides.

The 1918 Millionaires eventually filled the band added by the 1909 Senators. The 1915 Ottawa Senators, the 1916 Portland Rosebuds and the 1918 Vancouver Millionaires all engraved their names on the trophy even though they did not officially win it under the new PCHA-NHA system. They had won the title of only the previous champion's league and would have been crowned as Cup champions under the old challenge rules. The winners in 1918 and 1920 to 1923 did not put their winning team name on it.

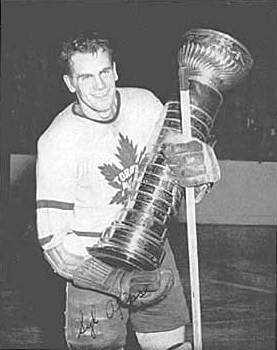
Syl Apps, with the "Stovepipe Cup" before it was redesigned, in the 1940s

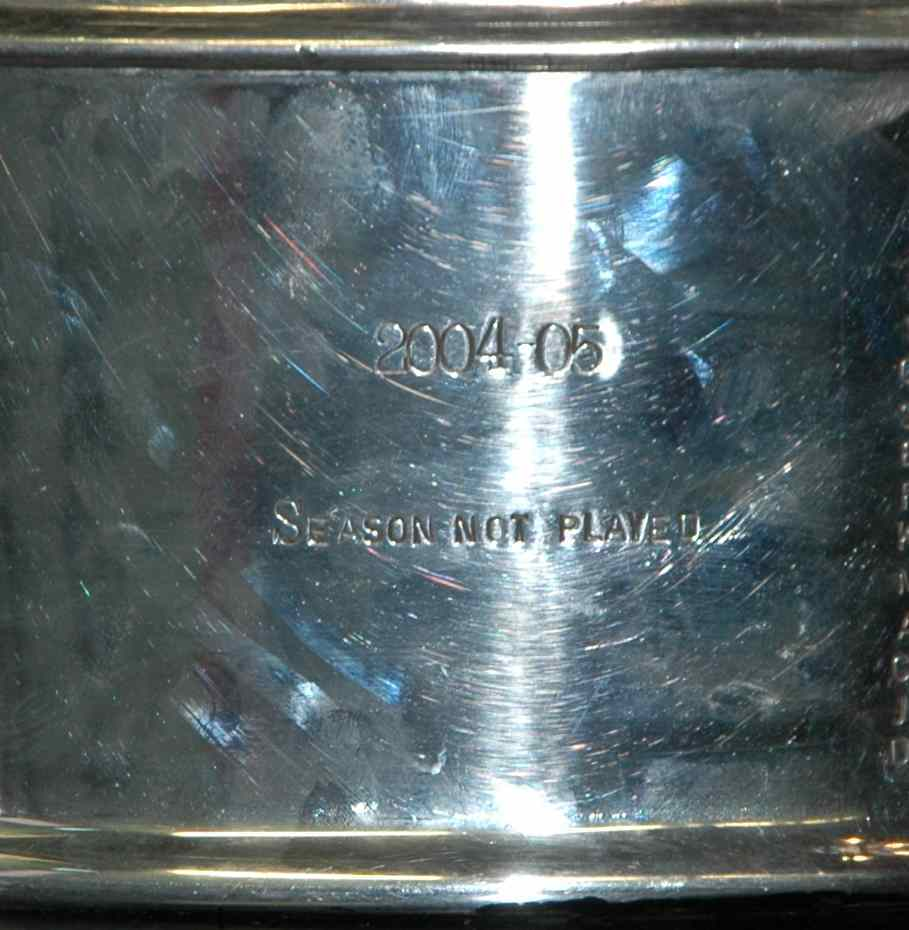
The lockout-cancelled season is noted by the inscription "2004–05 season not played"

No further engraving occurred until 1924, when the Canadiens added a new band to the Cup. Since then, engraving the team and its players has been an unbroken annual tradition. Originally, a new band was added each year, causing the trophy to grow in size. The "Stovepipe Cup", as it was nicknamed because of its resemblance to the exhaust pipe of a stove, became unwieldy, so it was redesigned in 1948 as a two-piece cigar-shaped trophy with a removable bowl and collar. This Cup also properly honoured those teams that did not engrave their names on the Cup. Also included was the 1918–19 no decision between the Montreal Canadiens and Seattle Metropolitans.

Since 1958, the Cup has undergone several minor alterations. The original collar and bowl were too brittle, and were replaced in 1963 and 1969, respectively. The modern one-piece Cup design was introduced in 1958, when the old barrel was replaced with a five-band barrel, each of which could contain 13 winning teams. Although the bands were originally designed to fill up during the Cup's centennial year in 1992, the names of the 1965 Montreal Canadiens were engraved over a larger area than allotted and thus there are 12 teams on that band instead of 13. When the bands were all filled in 1991, the top band of the large barrel was preserved in the Hockey Hall of Fame, and a new blank band was added to the bottom so the Stanley Cup would not grow further.

Another new band was scheduled to be added to the bottom of the cup following the 2004–05 season, but was not added because of the 2004–05 NHL lockout. After the 2005–06 champion Carolina Hurricanes were crowned and the new bottom ring was finally added (along with the retiring of the band listing the 1940–41 to 1952–53 champions), the cancelled season was acknowledged with the words "2004–05 season not played".

Following the crowning of the 2017–18 champions, the Washington Capitals, the band listing the 1953–54 to 1964–65 winners was removed in September 2018, with a new band for the 2017–18 to 2029–30 champions added to the bottom of the cup. Since the introduction of the five-band cup, each engraved team is displayed on the trophy between 52 and 65 years (though in practice, this was reduced by one year as a result of the 1953–1965 band only containing 12 teams prior to its removal), depending on the order they are engraved on the relevant band.

There have only been four official Stanley Cup engravers. The fourth and current one, Montreal silversmith Louise St. Jacques, has held the position since 1988.

Currently, the Cup stands at 89.5 centimetres (35 1/4 inches) tall and weighs 15 1/2 kilograms (34 1/2 lb). By its 125th anniversary in 2017, the Stanley Cup had had 3,177 names engraved on it; of those, 1,331 belong to players.

=== Name inscriptions ===
Currently, to qualify for automatic engraving, a player must have played, or have dressed as the backup goaltender, for at least half of the championship team's regular season games, or have played, or have dressed as the backup goaltender, for at least one game of the Stanley Cup Final for the championship team. However, since 1994, teams have been permitted to petition the NHL Commissioner, to be considered on a case-by-case basis, to engrave a player's name on the cup if the player was unavailable to play due to "extenuating circumstances". For example, the Chicago Blackhawks received special permission from the NHL to inscribe the names of Daniel Carcillo and Joakim Nordström in 2015 despite not meeting the automatic qualifications.

With the Montreal Canadiens winning by far the most Cup championships of any team, the list of the players who have been engraved on the Cup the most often is dominated by Montreal players. Henri Richard of the Canadiens, with his name engraved eleven times, played on more Stanley Cup champions than any other player. He is followed by Jean Béliveau and Yvan Cournoyer of the Canadiens with ten championships, Claude Provost of the Canadiens with nine, and three players tied with eight: Red Kelly (four with the Red Wings, four with the Leafs, the most for any player who was not a member of the Canadiens) and Canadiens players Jacques Lemaire, Maurice Richard. Beliveau's name appears on the Cup more than any other individual, ten times as a player and seven times as management for a total of seventeen times.

Twenty women have had their names engraved on the Stanley Cup. The first woman to have her name engraved on the Stanley Cup is Marguerite Norris, who won the Cup as the president of the Detroit Red Wings in 1954 and 1955. The only Canadian woman to have her name engraved on the Stanley Cup is Sonia Scurfield who won the Cup as a co-owner of the Calgary Flames in 1989.

=== Engraving errors ===
There are several misspellings on the Cup. Many of them have never been corrected. Examples include:

- Pat McReavy's name is misspelled "McCeavy" as a member of the 1941 Boston Bruins on the second cup created during the 1957–58 season. McReavy's name was often misspelled as "McCreavy" on team pictures of the Boston Bruins. When the Replica Cup was created in 1992–93, the misspelling was not corrected.
- Dickie Moore, who won the Cup six times, had his name spelled differently five times (D. Moore, Richard Moore, R. Moore, Dickie Moore, Rich Moore).
- Similarly, Jacques Plante won the Cup five times in a row, and his name was spelled differently each time.
- Glenn Hall's name was misspelled as "Glin" in 1951–52.
- Alex Delvecchio's name was misspelled as "Belvecchio" in 1954.
- Bob Gainey was spelled "Gainy" when he was a player for Montreal in the 1970s.
- Ted Kennedy was spelled "Kennedyy" in the 1940s.
- Toronto Maple Leafs was spelled "Leaes" in 1963.
- Boston Bruins was spelled "BQSTQN" in 1972.
- New York Islanders was spelled "Ilanders" in 1981.
- In 1996, Colorado Avalanche winger Adam Deadmarsh had his surname misspelled as "Deadmarch". It was later corrected, marking the first correction on the Cup. Similar corrections were made in 2002, 2006 and 2010 for the names of Detroit Red Wings goalie Manny Legace ("Lagace"), Carolina Hurricanes forward Eric Staal ("Staaal") and Chicago Blackhawks forward Kris Versteeg ("Vertseeg").

=== Scratched-out names ===
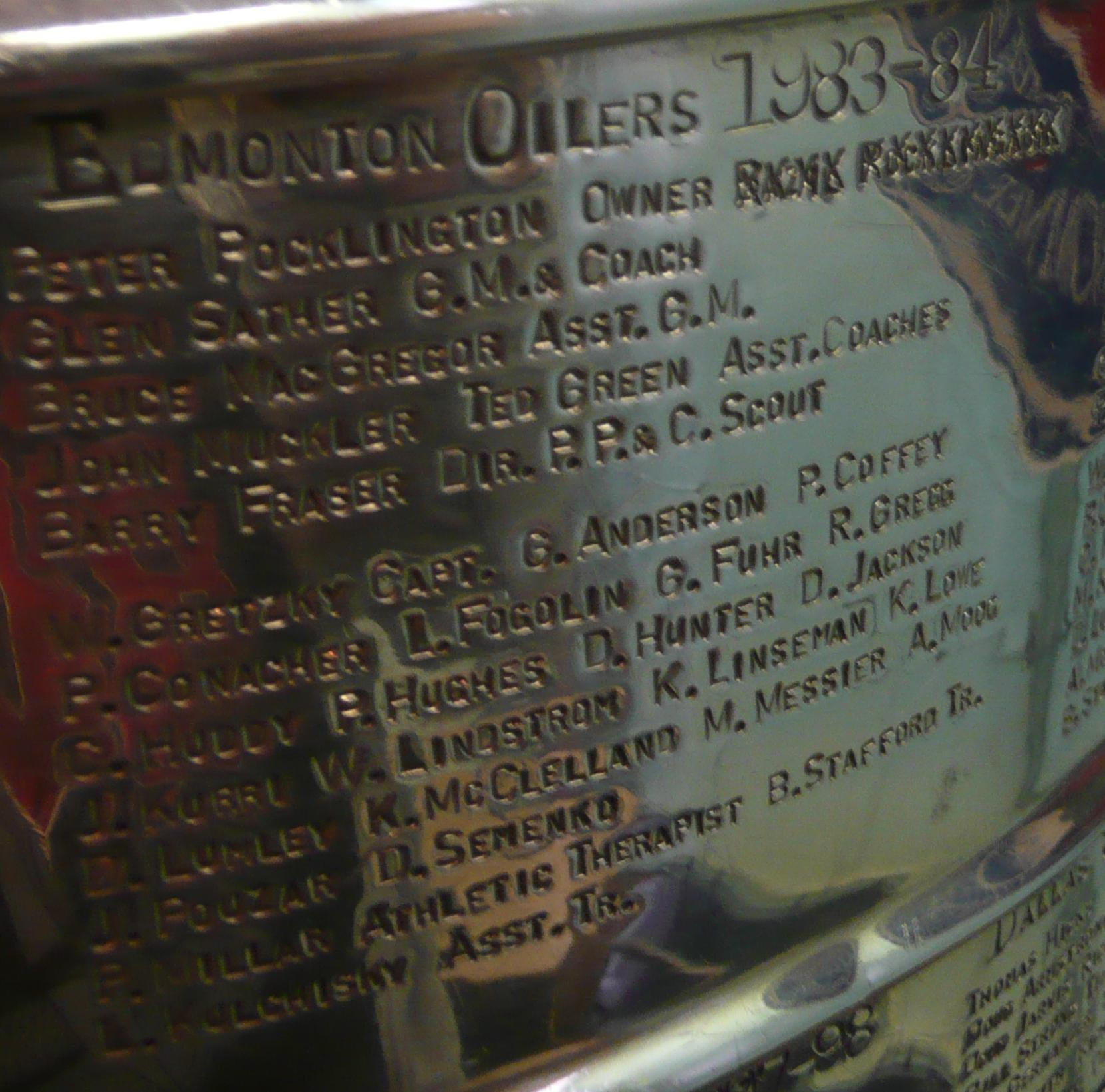
Basil Pocklington, father of Peter, the owner of the Edmonton Oilers, is scratched out in the 1984 engraving (top right corner).

The following names were later scratched out with a series of "X"s:

- Peter Pocklington, then-owner of the Edmonton Oilers, put his father's name, Basil, on the Stanley Cup in 1984. Because Basil had no affiliation with the Oilers or the NHL at all, the league had his name stricken.
- Brad Aldrich, the Chicago Blackhawks video review coach during their Stanley Cup run in 2010, was stricken from the Stanley Cup at the team's request in 2021, following the conclusion of an investigation that revealed he had sexually abused former Blackhawks prospect Kyle Beach, among others.

== Traditions and anecdotes ==
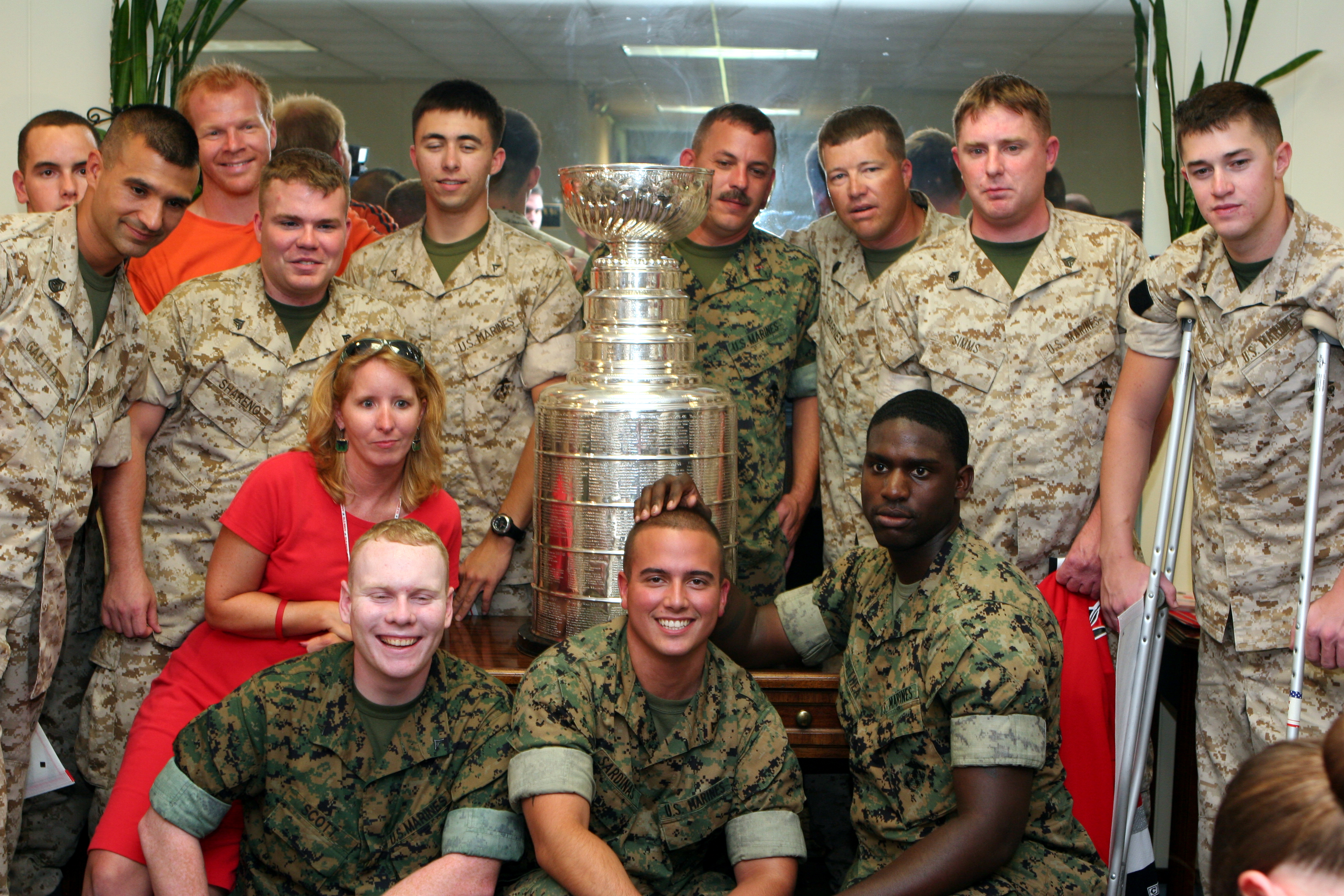
July 13, 2006: Wounded United States Marines pose with Carolina Hurricanes star Glen Wesley (in orange shirt) and the Stanley Cup.

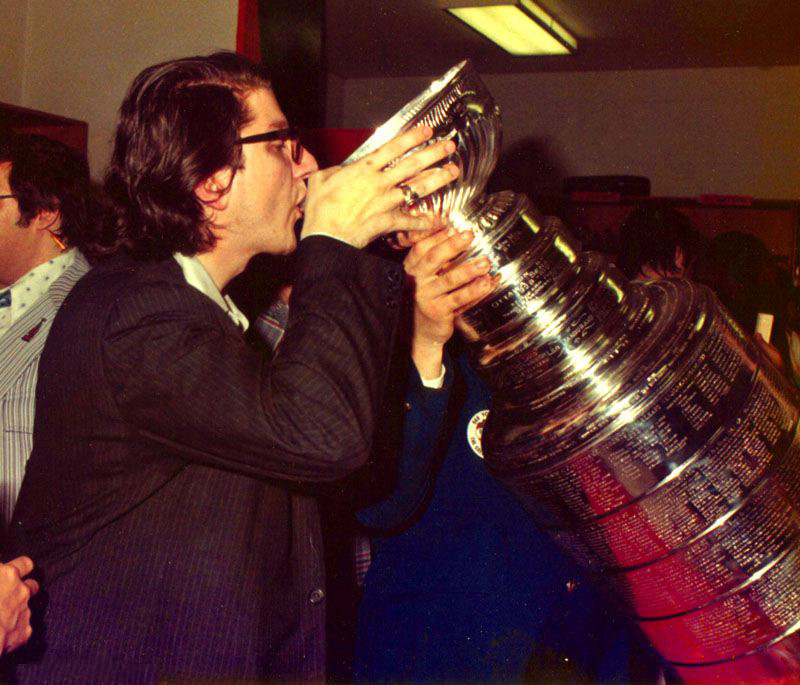
Players and team personnel often drink from the Cup to celebrate, as shown here in 1974.

There are many traditions associated with the Stanley Cup. One of the oldest, started by the 1896 Winnipeg Victorias, dictates that the winning team drink champagne from the top bowl after their victory. The Cup is also traditionally presented on the ice by the NHL commissioner to the captain of the winning team after the series-winning game; each member of the victorious club carries the trophy around the rink. However, this has not always been the case; prior to the 1930s, the Cup was not awarded immediately after the victory. The first time that the Cup was awarded on the ice may have been to the 1932 Toronto Maple Leafs, but the practice did not become a tradition until the 1950s. Ted Lindsay of the 1950 Cup champion Detroit Red Wings became the first captain, upon receiving the Cup, to hoist it overhead and skate around the rink. According to Lindsay, he did so to allow the fans to have a better view of the Cup. Since then, it has been a tradition for each member of the winning team, beginning with the captain, to take a lap around the ice with the trophy hoisted above his head.

The tradition of the captain first hoisting the Cup has been "breached" a few times. In 1987 after the Edmonton Oilers defeated the Philadelphia Flyers, Wayne Gretzky handed the Cup to Steve Smith, a year after Smith made a costly gaffe that cost the Oilers the chance of making their fourth consecutive Stanley Cup Final appearance. The second occurred in 1993 after the Montreal Canadiens defeated the Los Angeles Kings, Guy Carbonneau handed the Cup to Denis Savard, as Savard had been the player that many fans had urged the Canadiens to draft back in 1980. The third was in 2001 involving Joe Sakic and Ray Bourque when the Colorado Avalanche won the Cup in 2001, as the seventh and deciding game of the Final was the last of Bourque's 22-year NHL career, having never been on a cup-winning team until that time (until being traded to the Avalanche on March 6, 2000, Bourque had played only for the Boston Bruins). When Sakic received the trophy, he did not hoist it, but instead immediately handed it to Bourque; Sakic then became the second player on the team to hoist the trophy.

The Stanley Cup championship team is allotted 100 days during off-season to pass around the Cup. It is always accompanied by at least one representative from the Hockey Hall of Fame. Although many players have unofficially spent a day in personal possession of the Cup, in 1995 the New Jersey Devils started a tradition wherein each member of the Cup-winning team is allowed to retain the Cup for a day. After the 1994–95 season, the NHL made it mandatory that one of the official Cup handlers always be present while the Cup is passed around among players in the off-season. This may have been related to Eddie Olczyk's handling of the Cup after the New York Rangers' 1994 win; Olczyk brought the Cup to the Meadowlands Racetrack, where Kentucky Derby winner Go for Gin stuck his head in it.

On August 22, 2001, Colorado Avalanche Director of Finance Mark Waggoner carried the Stanley Cup to the summit of Mount Elbert, the highest point of Colorado.

Victors of the Cup have used it to baptize their children. Three players (the New York Islanders' Clark Gillies, the Anaheim Ducks' Sean O'Donnell, and the Pittsburgh Penguins' Nick Bonino) even allowed their dogs to eat out of the Cup.

=== Original, authenticated, and replica versions ===
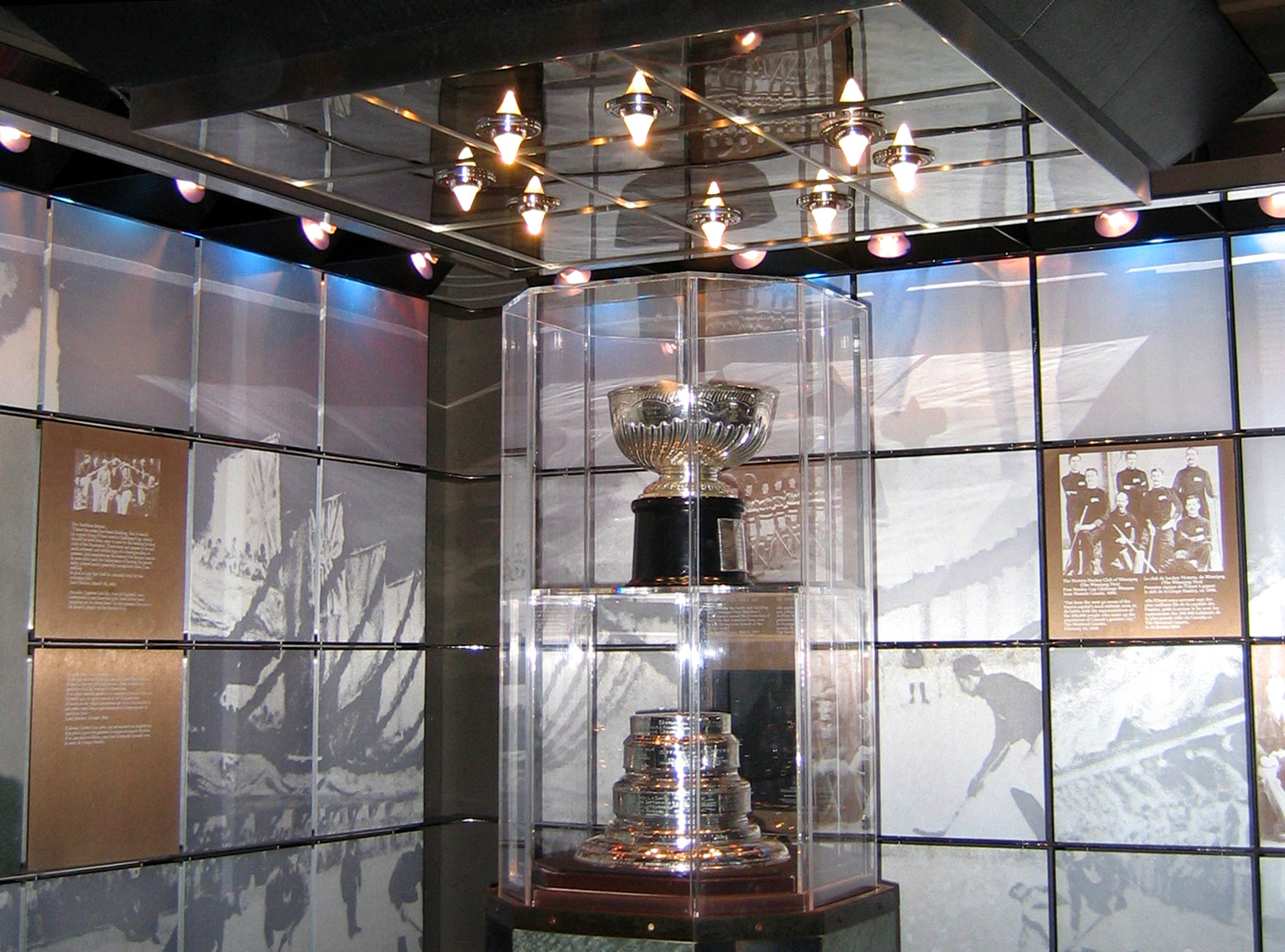
The original Stanley Cup in the bank vault at the Hockey Hall of Fame in Toronto, Ontario

There are technically three versions of the "Stanley Cup": the original 1892 bowl or Dominion Hockey Challenge Cup, 1963 authenticated "Presentation Cup", and the 1993 "Permanent Cup" at the Hall of Fame.

The original 1892 Dominion Hockey Challenge Cup, purchased and donated by Lord Stanley, was physically awarded to the Champions until 1970, and is now displayed in the Vault Room at the Hockey Hall of Fame in Toronto, Ontario.

The authenticated version or "Presentation Cup" was created in 1963 by Montreal silversmith Carl Petersen. NHL president Clarence Campbell felt that the original bowl was becoming too thin and fragile, and thus requested a duplicate trophy as a replacement. The Presentation Cup is authenticated by the seal of the Hockey Hall of Fame on the bottom, which can be seen when winning players lift the Cup over their heads, and it is the one currently awarded to the champions of the playoffs and used for promotions. This version was made in secret, and first awarded in 1964.

The replica "Permanent Cup", was created in 1993 by Montreal silversmith Louise St. Jacques to be used as a stand-in at the Hockey Hall of Fame whenever the Presentation Cup is not available for display.

=== As a morale booster ===
The Stanley Cup has been brought to military bases for both American and Canadian troops, as well as their NATO allies. In 2004, the Cup was displayed at MacDill Air Force Base, near Tampa, Florida. The event was later touted by officials at MacDill as "a huge morale booster for our troops". In 2006, the Cup toured Marine Corps Base Camp Lejeune, North Carolina, where wounded Marines were given the opportunity to view and be photographed with the Cup.

In 2007, the Stanley Cup made its first trip into a combat zone. During the trip to Kandahar, Afghanistan from May 2 to 6, organized by the NHL, the Hockey Hall of Fame, the NHL Alumni and the Canadian Department of National Defence, the Cup was put on display for Canadian and other NATO troops. The Cup was not damaged when its host base sustained a rocket attack on May 3.

The Stanley Cup was returned to Afghanistan as part of a "Team Canada visit" in March 2008. In the spring of 2010 the Stanley Cup made its fourth trip to Afghanistan, accompanied by ex-players.

On June 27, 2010, Chicago Blackhawks defenceman Brent Sopel paid tribute to his friend, former Toronto Maple Leafs general manager Brian Burke and Burke's late son, Brendan, by accompanying the Cup to the 2010 Chicago Gay Pride Parade.

In 2018, the Cup was used to improve the spirits of those who were affected by either of two significant events which claimed the lives of multiple individuals: the Humboldt Broncos' bus crash on April 6, and the Capital Gazette shooting on June 28. For the former, the Stanley Cup was brought to the hospital where the crash survivors were recuperating on April 15, and for the latter, it was presented to Capital Gazette employees at their temporary office on July 3. Chandler Stephenson of the 2018 Washington Capitals also spent his day with the Stanley Cup with the Broncos that August.

== Trustees ==
The regulations set down by Lord Stanley call for two trustees, who had the sole, joint right to govern the Cup and the conditions of its awarding until 1947 when they ceded control to the NHL. While the original regulations allow for a trustee to resign, to date, only Ian "Scotty" Morrison retired as trustee in 2023. All other trustees have served until their deaths. In the event of a vacancy, the remaining trustee names the replacement for the deceased or resigned trustee.

== See also ==
- Avco World Trophy, awarded to the champion of the defunct World Hockey Association
- List of awards named after governors general of Canada
- List of awards presented by the governor general of Canada
- List of NHL franchise post-season appearance streaks
- List of NHL franchise post-season droughts
- List of Stanley Cup challenge games
- List of Stanley Cup champions
- Lord Derby Cup, the emblem of France's premier rugby league knockout competition, named after Frederick Stanley's son Edward
