= Lord Stanley's Gift Monument =

Public monument in Ottawa Canada

- {{{other_names}}}
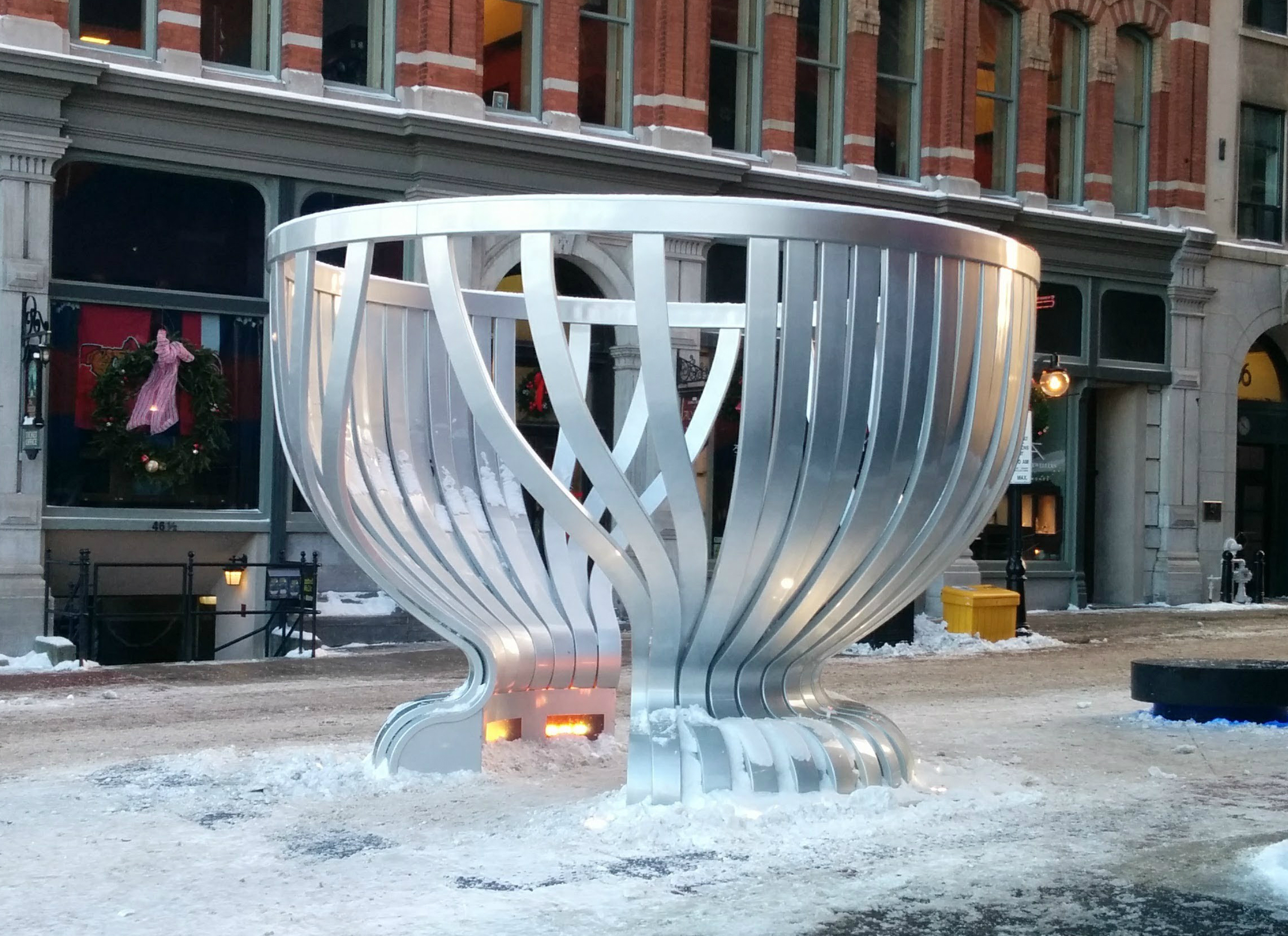
- View from west, of Stanley Cup commemorative sculpture on Sparks Street in Ottawa, Ontario, Canada
- Design: Covit/Nguyen/NORR
- Opened: October 28, 2017
- Owner: City of Ottawa
- Location: Sparks Street at Elgin Street, Ottawa, Ontario, Canada
- Location in Ottawa
- Coordinates: 45.4235695°N 75.6957916°W

The Lord Stanley's Gift Monument is a monument in Ottawa, Ontario, Canada. It commemorates the donation of the Stanley Cup ice hockey championship trophy by Canada's Governor-General the Lord Stanley of Preston in 1893. It is located on the eastern end of the Sparks Street Mall. It was constructed at the culmination of a public campaign to commemorate the donation of the trophy.

== Stanley Cup ==
In the 1891–92 Ottawa Hockey Club season of play, the Ottawa Hockey Club won all of its games in Amateur Hockey Association of Canada (AHAC) play, except for the final game. The final game result meant the AHAC championship was given to the Montreal Hockey Club, despite Ottawa having defeated Montreal three times to Montreal's one victory. At the team's season-ending banquet held at the Russell House Hotel in Ottawa, the club was given a letter by Lord Stanley. Lord Stanley and his family, residents of Ottawa during his term, were fans of the sport, participated in the sport, and were regular attendees at Ottawa games. Lord Stanley announced in the letter that he was to donate a cup to be given to the season's champions, designated the champion of Canada. He also expressed his disappointment with the current series method of play, suggesting instead a round-robin format, with the eventual champion given to the team with the best record, after which designated "challenge" games could be played, to contest the holder of the trophy. The Cup was placed under the care of trustees, who would decide which teams would qualify to play for the trophy.

The Cup was first given to the Montreal Hockey Club in 1893, which won the 1893 AHAC season, held under the new round-robin rules. The trophy in following years would be contested by amateur teams from all over Canada. Starting in 1908, professionals were allowed to compete on teams for the Stanley Cup, and the new Allan Cup was donated to be given to the amateur champion, while the Stanley Cup would be contested by teams without restriction. Beginning in 1910, the Cup was contested by the teams of the National Hockey Association (NHA) (becoming the National Hockey League (NHL) in 1917) and the Pacific Coast Hockey Association (PCHA) until the mid-1920s. After the folding of the PCHA, the Stanley Cup has since been contested only by the teams of the NHL.

The Stanley Cup trustees had sole control of the trophy until 1914 when they decided to let the leagues choose the champions and challengers. Over time, as trustees have died, new trustees have been named. It is an honorary role, as the National Hockey League has been solely responsible for and has controlled the trophy since 1947. The original Cup, and the trophy used in its likeness today, are cared for by, and housed at, the Hockey Hall of Fame in Toronto, Ontario, Canada.

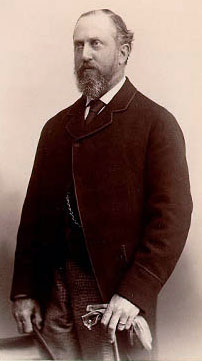
The Lord Stanley of Preston

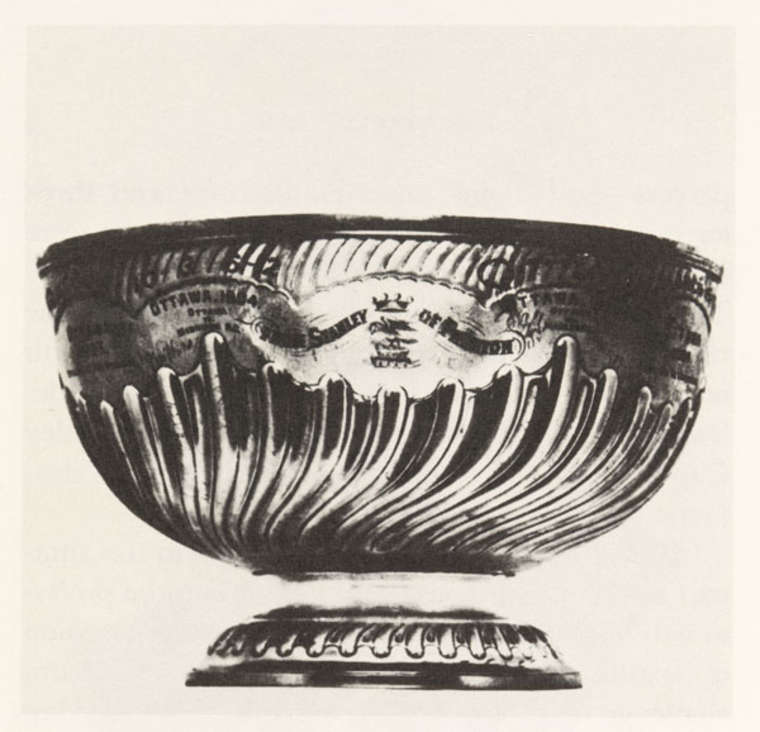
Original Stanley Cup

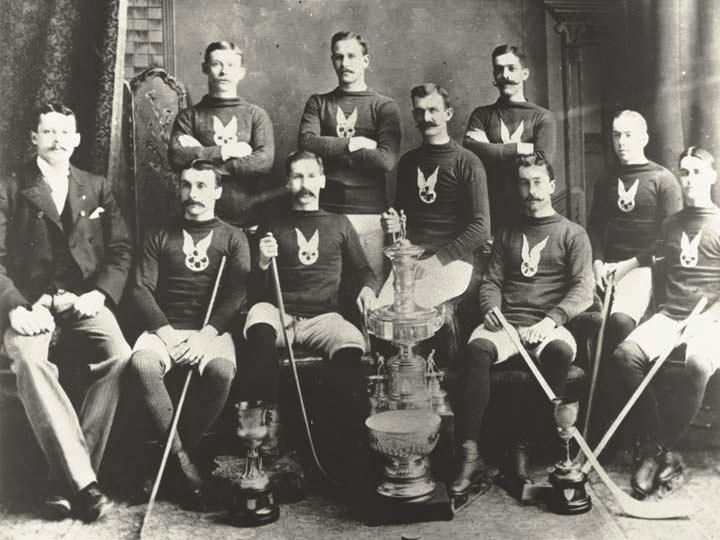
Montreal Hockey Club: first champions

== Monument ==
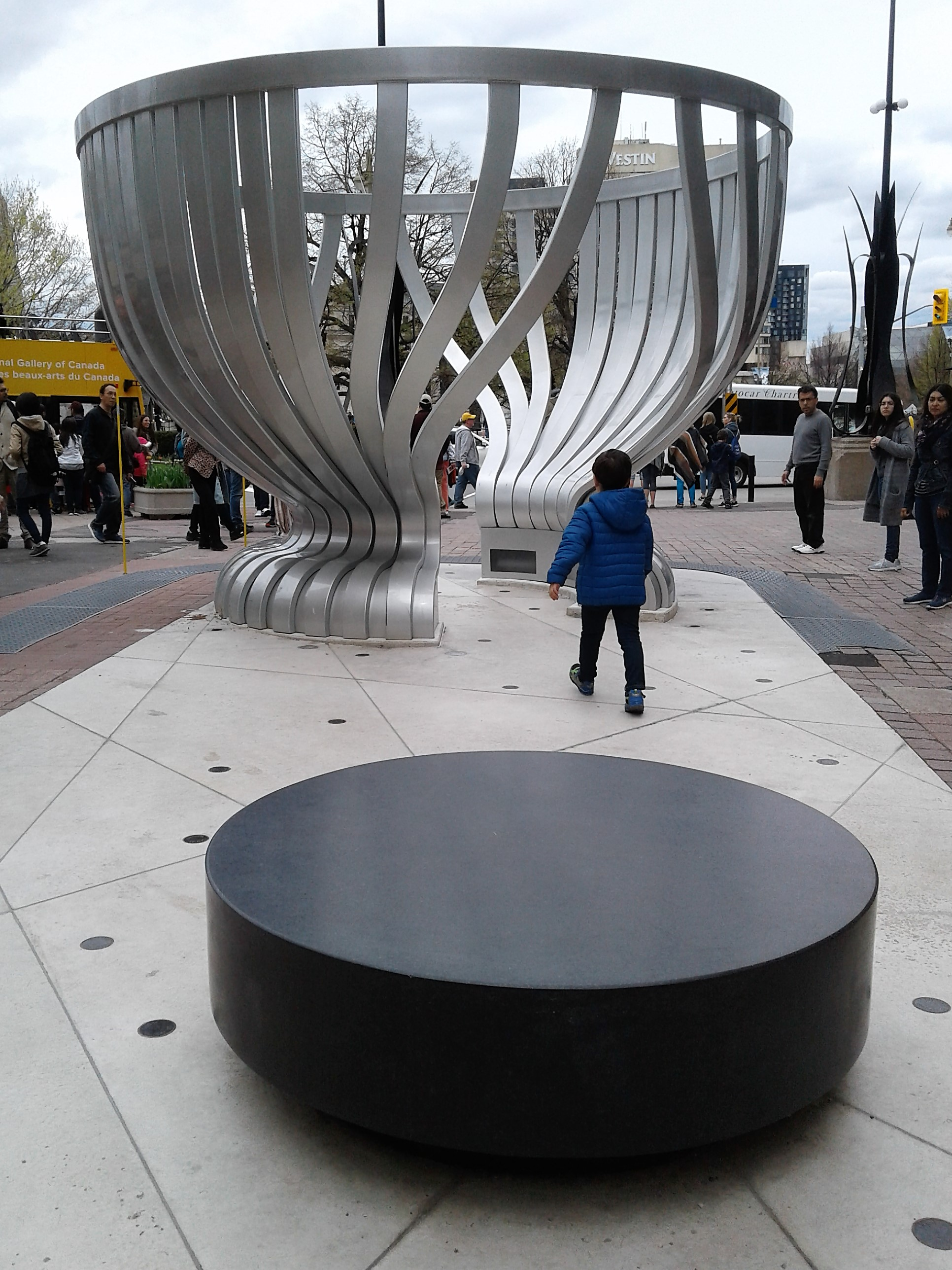
On Sparks Street, Ottawa

In 2009, ice hockey historian Paul Kitchen started organizing a campaign to create a public monument to be placed outdoors in Ottawa, to commemorate the donation of the Stanley Cup by Lord Stanley. The group started a fund-raising campaign and received funds from private and public sources. Some private donors rescinded their donation after learning their names would not be on the monument. The Canadian Government's Canadian Heritage department ended up contributing CA$2.15 million to complete the project, which had a total budget of CA$2.5 million. Project partners also included the City of Ottawa, the National Hockey League and the Ottawa Senators.

Forty design entries were received for the monument and a jury including Roch Carrier and Ken Dryden evaluated the eight finalists' designs. The winning design is by Covit/Nguyen/NORR of Montreal. The location, at Sparks and Elgin, was not the initial selection of the campaign, and the design had to be scaled to fit the location. An existing sculpture at the site was moved one block west. The completed monument was unveiled on October 28, 2017. The unveiling ceremony was attended by Ottawa Mayor Jim Watson, MP David McGuinty representing the Government of Canada, George Hunter of Lord Stanley's Gift Monument Inc., and representatives of the Ottawa Senators and the NHL.

The winning design is a metal sculpture, representative of the original bowl dedicated by Lord Stanley. The sculpture is approximately 20 feet (6.1 m) high. The bowl of the sculpture is composed of silver metal ribs, curved in the distinctive shape of the trophy's bowl. It is open on two sides so that people can walk through the bowl. The bowl's base contains coloured lighting to illuminate the sculpture. A large black disk is nearby, in the design of an ice hockey puck. The Cup and puck rest on an area of paving that has been modified to resemble an ice rink. Embedded in the rink, are 39 decorative pucks, for each team that has won the Stanley Cup. Descriptive panels explaining the trophy are nearby, explaining the history of the donation, the monument campaign, and details about the winning design.
