= Blackpool pier =

Blackpool pier may refer to one of three piers in the English seaside resort town of Blackpool, in Lancashire:

- North Pier, Blackpool
- Central Pier, Blackpool
- South Pier, Blackpool
