= Golden Mile (Blackpool) =

Seafront promenade in north west England

Coordinates: 53.815°N 3.055°W

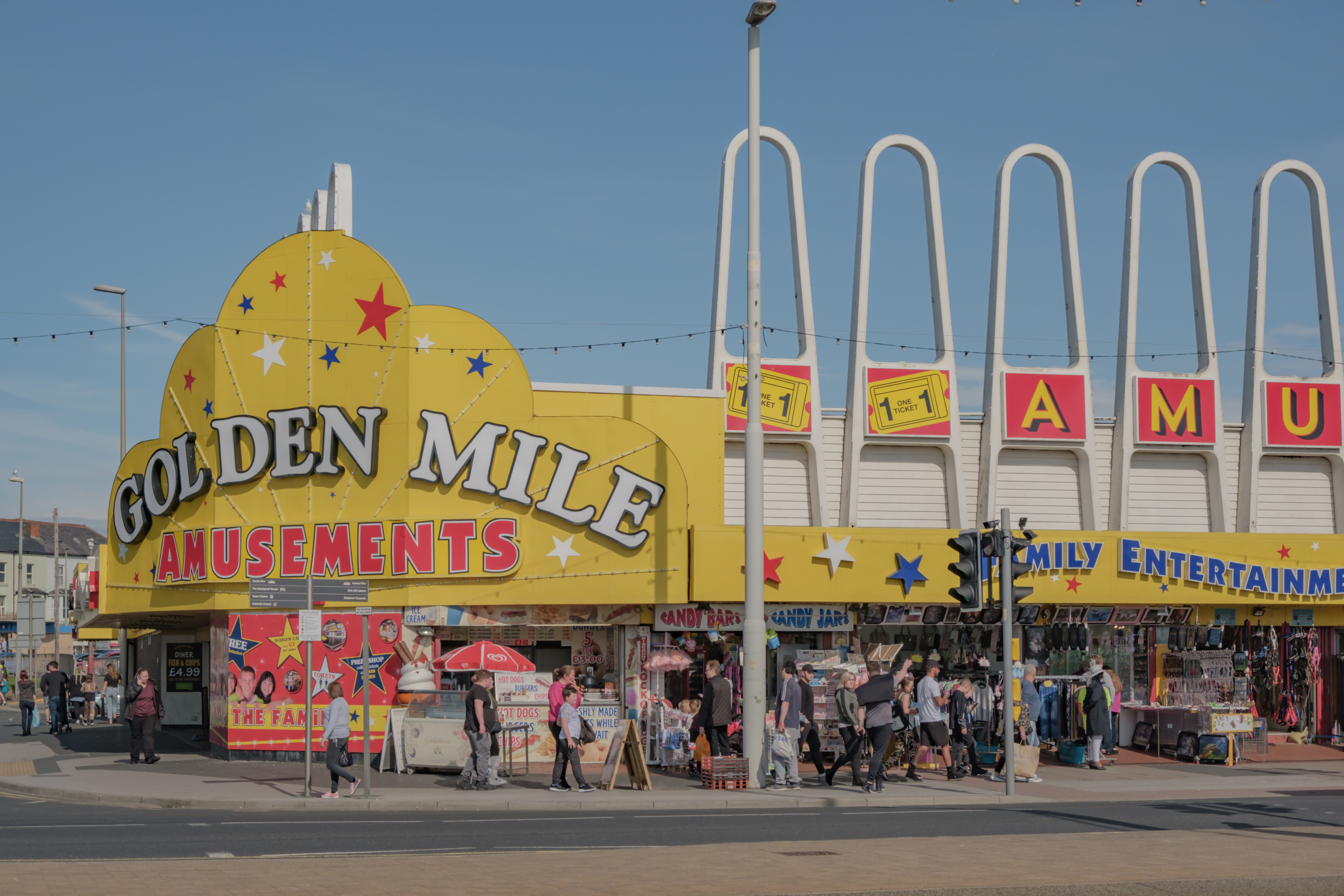
Blackpool's Golden Mile Amusements in 2023

The Golden Mile is the name given to the stretch of Blackpool Promenade, between the North Pier and South Pier, in Blackpool, Lancashire, England. The actual length of the Golden Mile is 1.7 miles (2.7 kilometres).

== Background ==
In 1897 Blackpool Corporation imposed by-laws where "no trading would be permitted on the beach" aside from "donkeys, camels and boatmen". Backlash to the decision included from tradesmen and the press with the Fleetwood Chronicle commenting:

"That Blackpool sands, the very Mecca of all the charlatanry and humbug of the land, should be purified and dedicated only to the uses of… the patient donkey and the insinuating boatman seems incredible… It is too late in the day to attempt to refine the character of Blackpool. The bulk of Lancashire people who go to Blackpool want Blackpool as they have known it, with its life, its hurly-burly and its riotous fun. To attempt to make Blackpool conventional and 'respectable' would be to ruin it and drive its supporters elsewhere."

The Corporation compromised by allowing traders such as ventriloquists, Punch and Judy shows and ice cream sellers to remain while "phrenologists, "quack" doctors, palmists, mock auctions and cheap jacks" were prohibited. The ban found the outliers move onto Central Promenade where they erected stalls in front gardens. The stretch became known as the Golden Mile.

== Sideshows ==
One of the Golden Mile's key features until the 1960s would become sideshows. In 1889 The Gazette wrote:

“If the front land is covered with howling cheap-jacks, swindling catchpenny trickeries etc., while the shops behind are let for two-headed giantesses, fat women, penny-in-the-slot indecencies etc., then what a disreputable pandemonium will Central Beach eventually become!”

In 1933 the Lancashire Evening Post described witnessing "Starving brides and glass coffins, men with no legs or arms, men with 'cork-screw' bodies and three legs, skeletons and pigmies, 'tombs of death,' and 'dusky dancing beauties’." Luke Gannon, who occupied premises on the south corner of Brunswick Street, was responsible for the 'Starving Bride' sideshows as well as displaying the disgraced Rector of Stiffkey in a barrel to protest his innocence following a conviction of immorality by a church court.
