= Central Pier =

Central Pier may refer to:

- Central Pier, Blackpool, UK
- Central Pier, Melbourne Docklands, Australia
- Central Piers, Hong Kong
- Central Pier, Atlantic City, New Jersey, United States
