= Rebellion Festival =

British punk rock festival

- Genre: Punk rock
- Locations: Blackpool (1996, 2002, 2006–2019, 2021–2026) / Morecambe (1997–2001, 2003–2005), Lancashire, England, UK; Online (2020)
- Years active: 1996–present

The Rebellion Festival, formerly Holidays in the Sun and the Wasted Festival is a British punk rock festival first held in 1996. The festival has attracted mainstream press coverage from such sources as The Independent, The Daily Telegraph and Kerrang.

== History ==
The first festival in 1996 was held at the Winter Gardens, Blackpool England. It is still held there now, although on some years the festival has been held in nearby Morecambe. In 1999 and 2000, a related event Holidays in the Smoke was held at The Dome, Tufnell Park, London. Festivals have also been held under the Rebellion and earlier brand names in Australia, United States, Japan, Germany, Netherlands, Italy, Belgium, the Basque Country, Ireland and Austria.

It is still a family-run, family-orientated event which celebrates Punk in all its forms, but also puts on bands from other alternative genres plus some Glam Rock artists and seminal bands from the 1960s and 1970s . There are up to seven music stages plus also an acoustic stage, a literary stage and a Punk Art gallery along with many workshops, and stalls for clothes, music and other products. Each year, over 300 acts perform at the festival over a four-day period, usually spread over the first weekend in August from Thursday to Sunday. There were some clashes with riot police outside the Winter Gardens in 2007. Since then the festival maintains a positive relationship with Blackpool Council and the people of Blackpool in general and has been commended for its involvement with local charities.

Another punk festival, Nice 'N Sleazy in Morecambe (renamed Sleazy Live from 2025), began life as an offshoot of Wasted in Morecambe, the 3B's (Breakfast, Beer, Bands) Festival, providing campsite accommodation with an unofficial stage. When Wasted reverted to Blackpool in 2006, the Morecambe campsite event continued as a separate festival.

2017 was the 21st anniversary of the festival which coincided with the 40th anniversary celebrations of Punk. The 2020 event was postponed to 2021 because of the COVID-19 pandemic and replaced with an online festival. In 2021 - although the full festival was postponed again until 2022 - organisers held a smaller replacement live event: the HITS 25 25th anniversary commemoration of the original 1996 Holiday In The Sun festival, announced at short notice as soon as the way was clear with regard to COVID-19 regulations.

The full festival resumed in 2022 with an additional event: R-Fest, held outdoors on the seafront on the Comedy Carpet.

The 2024 festival coincided with a series of race riots that erupted across the UK, during which attendees staged an anti-fascist counter-protest to a gathered far-right group in the city. This led to a stand-off in which chairs, bottles and planks of wood were thrown.

The 2025 edition coincided with a far-right protest taking place outside the Grand Metropole Hotel, part of the 2025 British anti-immigration protests, with whom anti-racist attendees of the festival again clashed.

Adam Ant headlined a "run up" show at the 2026 festival.

== Festivals ==
=== UK ===
Year	Name	Location
1996	Holidays in the Sun	Blackpool
1997	Holidays in the Sun	Morecambe
1998	Holidays in the Sun	Morecambe
1999	Holidays in the Sun	Morecambe
2000	Holidays in the Sun	Morecambe
2001	Holidays in the Sun	Morecambe
2002	Holidays in the Sun	Blackpool
2003	Holidays in the Sun	Morecambe
2004	Wasted	Morecambe
2005	Wasted	Morecambe
2006	Wasted	Blackpool
2007	Rebellion	Blackpool
2008	Rebellion	Blackpool
2009	Rebellion	Blackpool
2010	Rebellion	Blackpool
2011	Rebellion	Blackpool
2012	Rebellion	Blackpool
2013	Rebellion	Blackpool
2014	Rebellion	Blackpool
2015	Rebellion	Blackpool
2016	Rebellion	Blackpool
2017	Rebellion	Blackpool
2018	Rebellion	Blackpool
2019	Rebellion	Blackpool
2020	Rebellion	online
2021	HITS 25	Blackpool
2022	Rebellion	Blackpool
2023	Rebellion	Blackpool
2024	Rebellion	Blackpool
2025	Rebellion	Blackpool
2026	Rebellion	Blackpool

=== Rest of the World ===
Year	Name	Location
2000	Holidays in the Sun	Germany
2000	Holidays in the Sun	Basque Country
2001	Holidays in the Sun	USA
2002	Holidays in the Sun	Japan
2002	Holidays in the Sun	Ireland
2002	Holidays in the Sun	USA
2004	Wasted	Belgium
2005	Wasted	Netherlands
2006	Wasted	Netherlands
2006	Wasted	Australia
2007	Rebellion	Netherlands
2008	Rebellion	Austria
2010	Rebellion	Italy
2011	Rebellion	Netherlands
2014	Rebellion	Netherlands
2017	Rebellion	Ireland
2018	Rebellion	Netherlands

== See also ==
- List of punk rock festivals
