= Killers (2000 film) =

Killers is a short BBC film written by David Eldridge and directed by Mike Wadham.

Part of the drama lab series on BBC Three, Killers is set in a house in east London in which a group of lads are having a party. It looks at the relationships between young lads and how those relationships change when a female is added to the equation. Overseen by Tony Jordan, it stars Roland Manookian, Brooke Kinsella and Thomas Aldridge.

== Cast ==
- Roland Manookian
- Thomas Aldridge
- Brooke Kinsella
- Neil Maskell
- Billy Worth
- Freddy White
