= Blackpool Promenade =

Street in Blackpool, England

- The Prom
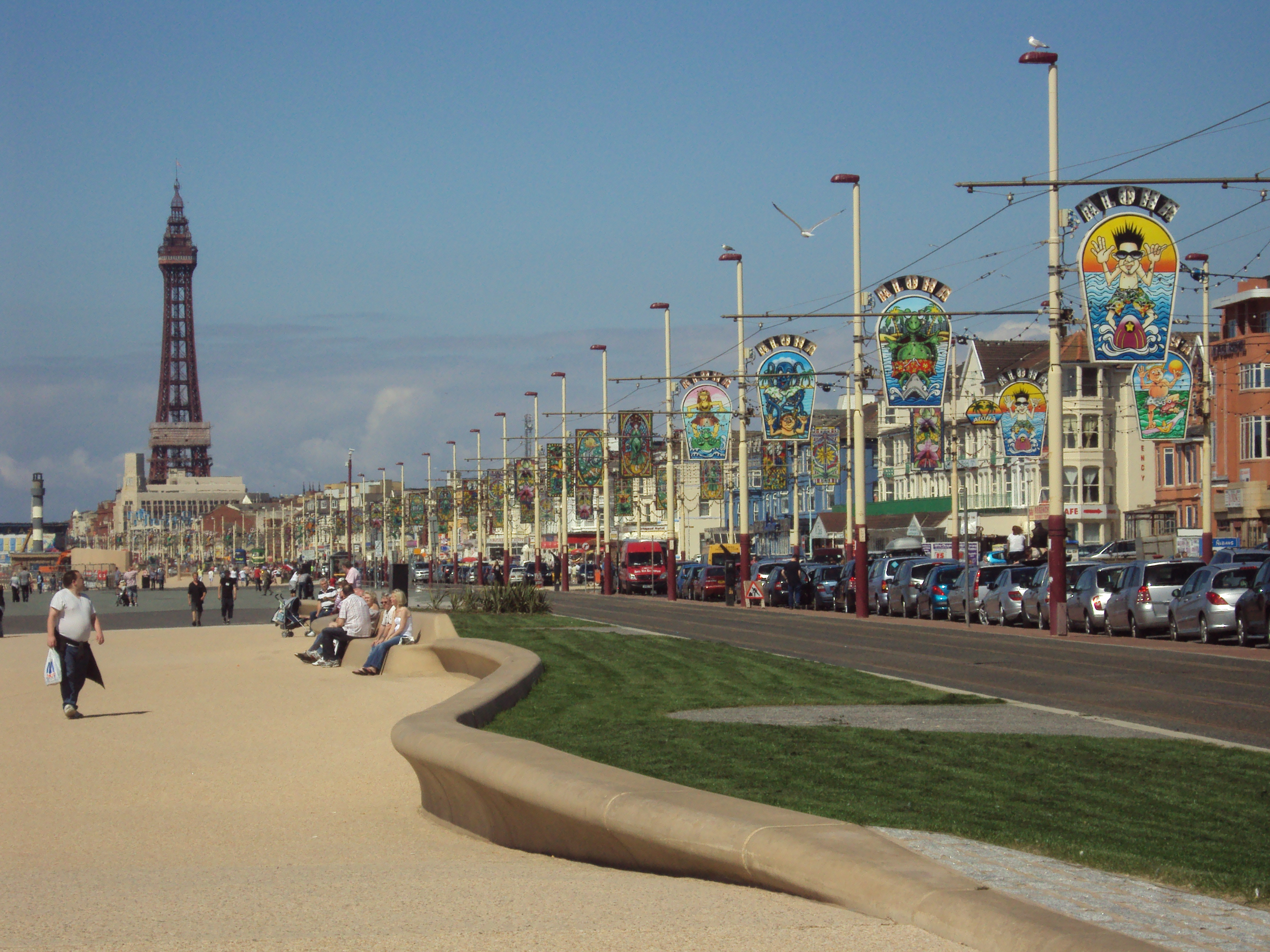
- Pictured in 2010, looking north towards Blackpool Tower
- Interactive map of Blackpool Promenade
- Part of: A584
- Length: 4 mi (6.4 km)
- Location: Blackpool, Lancashire, England
- North end: Queen's Promenade
- South end: Squires Gate Lane & Clifton Drive North

Construction
- Completed: 1820s

Blackpool Promenade (known colloquially as the Prom) is a road and esplanade in Blackpool, Lancashire, England. It runs for around 4 miles (6.4 km), from Queen's Promenade, at Gynn Square in the north, to a junction with Squires Gate Lane and Clifton Drive North, in the south. The promenade replaced a small parade which existed in the 1780s. That seafront road was subject to erosion, leading to a realigned replacement being constructed in the 1820s.

Blackpool's three piers―North, Central and South―have entrances from the esplanade, while the 518-foot (158-metre) Blackpool Tower overlooks the promenade and esplanade from the inland side, near Central Pier.

A 1.7-mile (2.7-kilometre) stretch of the promenade, between North Pier and South Pier, is called the "Golden Mile". The Comedy Carpet was installed in the esplanade, opposite Blackpool Tower, in 2011. It was designed by Gordon Young.

The town's annual Illuminations, established in 1879, run the entire length of the esplanade and promenade, plus an additional 1 mile (1.6 km) to the north, beyond Gynn Square to Red Bank Road on Bispham's Queen's Promenade.

== History ==
When the promenade first opened, it was 18 feet (5.5 m) wide and 600 feet (180 m) long. By 1901, it was 30 feet (9.1 m) wide and 450 feet (140 m) long. In 1911, the promenade was widened between North Pier and the Claremont Esplanade. In front of the Grand Metropole Hotel, it was widened to 100 feet (30 m).

On 2 October 1926, a "new promenade" was opened by Edward Stanley, 17th Earl of Derby. It was an extension of the work done in 1905. The work included the section between South Pier (then known as Victoria Pier) and the land "adjoining the Borough of Lytham" further south. The Earl also opened Stanley Park the same day.

A 2-mile (3.2 km) central section of the promenade was redeveloped between May 2010 and November 2011, at a cost of around £100 million.

== Gallery ==
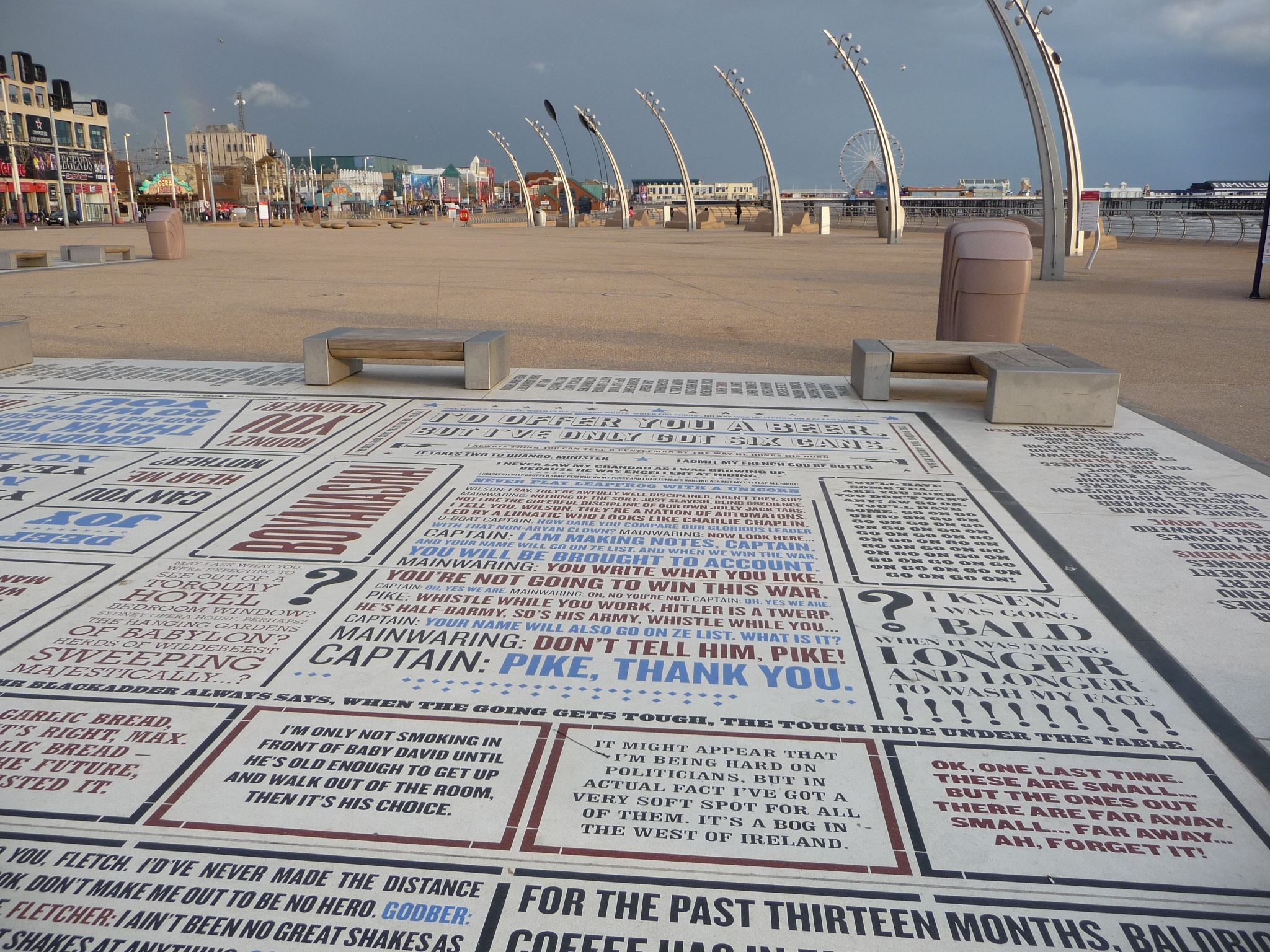
The "comedy carpet", looking south in 2013
