= Thomas Aldridge =

English actor (born 1982)

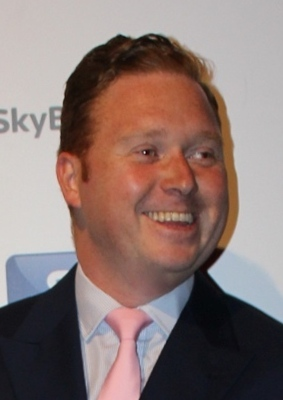
- Aldridge at O2 Premier of Kingsman
- Born: Thomas Edward Aldridge; 1982 (age 43–44); Great Dunmow, Essex, England
- Occupation: Actor
- Years active: 1994–present
- Spouse: Helen Owen (m. 2012)

Thomas Aldridge, also known as Tom Aldridge (born 1982), is an English television and theatre actor. He is best known for playing Ron Weasley in Harry Potter and the Cursed Child in London's West End. He is married to West End actress Helen Owen.

== Early career ==
Born in Essex, Aldridge has been working in professional theatre and television since the 1990s. As a child actor, he made his professional theatre debut in the Catherine Cookson play Fifteen Streets, at the Queen's Theatre Hornchurch. He then went on to feature in programs such as Our Boy with Ray Winstone, The Bill and London's Burning. After leaving school he played the role of Jenkins in Boyz Unlimited and Danny in the second series of the BBC drama Hope and Glory.

In 2000 Aldridge attended the Mountview Academy of Theatre Arts in London where he trained for three years. In his graduate year he played Jesus in the Andrew Lloyd Webber musical Jesus Christ Superstar at the Actors' Church in London's Covent Garden. Since then, Aldridge has continued to work concurrently in both television and theatre,

== Television and film ==
On screen, Aldridge has played Garvey in EastEnders, Steward Taylor in the 2012 ITV and ABC America series Titanic written by Downton Abbey and Gosford Park creator Julian Fellowes, Jimmy (Smudger) Collins in Call the Midwife, Callum Ross in Silent Witness, Jason in the BBC drama Killers written by David Eldridge and Tony Jordan, Darren Peasgood in Doctors, Warren in the second series of the ITV sci-fi drama Primeval, Reece in the second series of Law and Order UK, Copper in the BBC Three Original Drama short Flea. and Bridge in the BBC series Undercover written by Peter Moffat and starring Adrian Lester and Sophie Okonedo. Film roles include Phillip Patel in MI 9-2-5 directed by Blackadder director Richard Boden and Mikey in Elsa O'Tooles's Blasted nominated for best short at both Cannes film festival and Sundance Film Festival. In 2013 Aldridge starred as Spencer in the multi nominated British Broadcast Awards online comedy series The Support Group produced by the creators of The Inbetweeners - Bwark Productions. Most recently he has appeared as Mark Thomas in the groundbreaking BBC drama This is Going to Hurt written by Adam Kay and starring Ben Wishaw.

== Theatre ==
In the West End, Aldridge created the role of Barry in the original West End cast of Made in Dagenham at the Adelphi Theatre directed by Rupert Goold and starring Gemma Arterton. Written by Richard Bean, with music written by James Bond and Independence Day composer David Arnold and lyrics by Richard Thomas. In 2016 Aldridge joined the cast of the record breaking musical Les Misérables at the Queens Theatre playing the role of Grantaire. He was also part of the original London cast of the Cole Porter musical High Society, which starred Jerry Hall, at the Shaftesbury Theatre, after appearing in the UK tour. Also in the West End, he appeared alongside Sheridan Smith and Michael Medwin in the 2006 season at the Open Air Theatre, Regent's Park playing Francis Flute in A Midsummer Night's Dream, Curtis in The Taming of the Shrew and Pup in Babe. Aldridge played the Munchkin Mayor in the RSC production of The Wizard of Oz and also for the Royal Shakespeare Company, created the role of Bruce Bogtrotter in the development workshops of Matilda with music written by Australian comedian Tim Minchin.

On tour, Aldridge played Billy Kostecki in the first ever national tour of the musical Dirty Dancing. He also played Roger Parslow in the National Tour of the Philip Pullman trilogy His Dark Materials, Dickon in the West Yorkshire Playhouse production of The Secret Garden as well as the role of Tootles in the original cast of George Stiles and Anthony Drewe's musical adaptation of J.M Barrie's Peter Pan at the Birmingham Repertory Theatre and the West Yorkshire Playhouse, for which he features on the original cast recording album. He also appears on the original cast recording of Made in Dagenham.

In 2017, Aldridge took on the role of Ron Weasley in the West End play Harry Potter and the Cursed Child at the Palace Theatre, London. That year Harry Potter and the Cursed Child was nominated for a record breaking eleven Laurence Olivier Awards, winning nine. Making it the most awarded and most nominated show in the history of the Laurence Olivier Awards. A record it still holds today. Thomas Aldridge remains one of the longest serving cast members in the shows history.

== Commercials ==
Aldridge has featured in numerous commercials, including those for Mars, Gamestation and most notably fronting the adverts for Paddy Power throughout 2011 and 2012.
