= Helen Owen =

English theatre actress (born 1980)

Helen Owen (born 1 May 1980) is an English theatre actress known for her roles in Les Misérables, Mamma Mia and The Wizard of Oz. She is married to actor Thomas Aldridge.

== Early life ==
Born in Rochdale, England, Owen went to school at Oulder Hill Academy home of the Gracie Fields Theatre. After making an early professional debut in Manchester based drama City Central, Owen attended Blackpool College studying Performing Arts. She then went on to start a degree in music at Lancaster University. Leaving early, she then played Michelle in the original pilot for Two Pints of Lager and a Packet of Crisps before moving to London to study Musical Theatre at Guildford School of Acting.

== Career ==
Immediately after graduating in 2003, Owen made her West End debut in the London cast of Mamma Mia at the Prince Edward Theatre. In 2005 she played the role of Dorothy in the RSC production of The Wizard of Oz at the Birmingham Repertory Theatre, a role she reprised in the same production at the West Yorkshire Playhouse in 2006. Later that year Owen appeared in three productions at the Open Air Theatre, Regent's Park in A Midsummer Night's Dream, The Taming of the Shrew and The Boyfriend. It was here that she met actor Thomas Aldridge who she later went on to marry in 2012. In 2007 she returned to her home town of Rochdale to play Cinderella at the Gracie Fields Theatre. The following year she was cast in the London production of Les Misérables at the Queens Theatre. Over the following seven years, she went on to play the role of Eponine over 400 times as well as Cosette and made Les Misérables history by becoming the longest consecutive serving female in its history worldwide.
