= Comedy Carpet =

Public artwork by Gordon Young in Blackpool, England

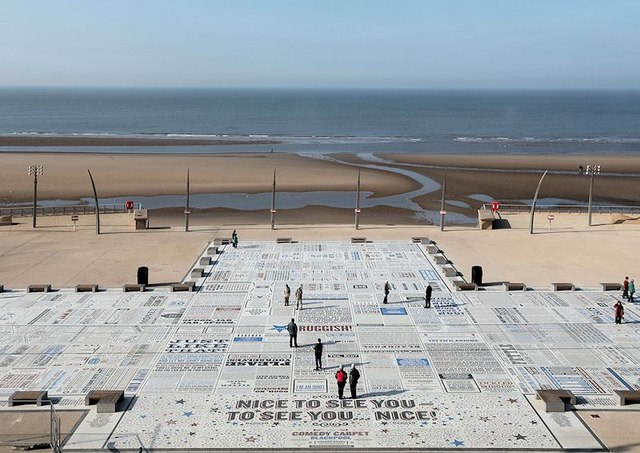
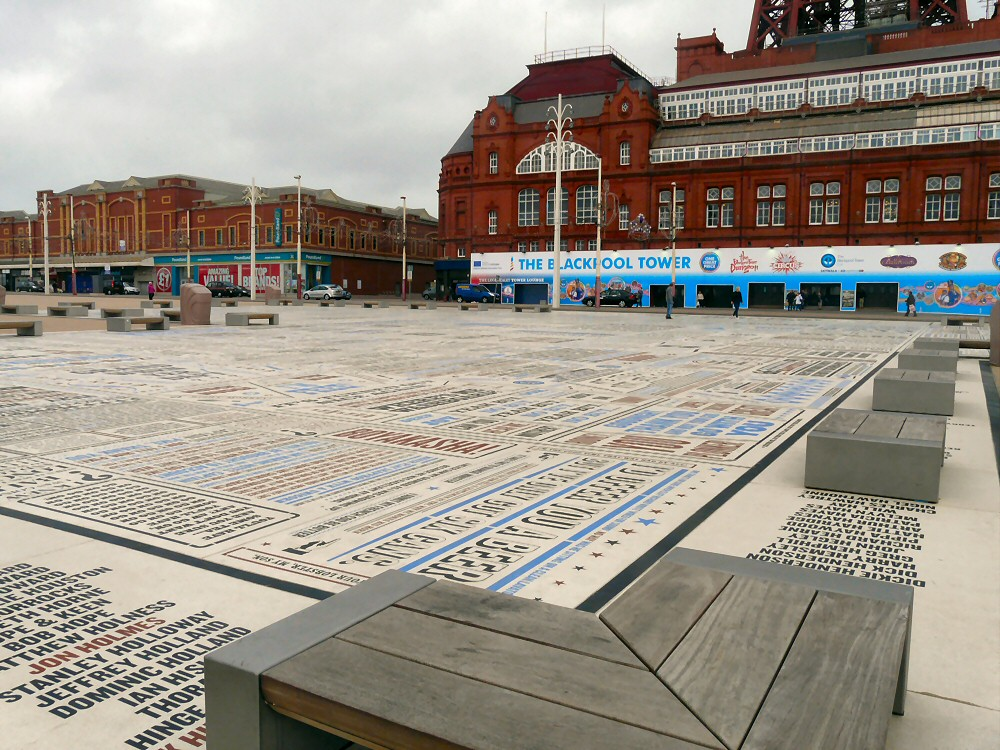
- Above: The artwork pictured from the Blackpool Tower building. Below: The artwork as seen when standing on it.

- Location within Blackpool Location within England

General information
- Type: Artwork
- Location: Blackpool Promenade, Blackpool, FY1
- Coordinates: 53.815884°N 3.056500°W
- Completed: 10 October 2011
- Cost: £2,600,000 (equivalent to about £3,840,000 in 2025)
- Owner: Blackpool Council

Dimensions
- Other dimensions: 2,200 square metres (23,681 sq ft)

Technical details
- Material: Granite (red and black letters), Concrete (blue letters and background)

Design and construction
- Architects: Gordon Young; Why Not Associates (typography)

The Comedy Carpet is a public art installation located in the British resort town of Blackpool, Lancashire. It is on the west side of Blackpool Promenade, adjacent to Blackpool Tower, in an area known as Tower Festival Headland.

Consisting of a concrete and granite surface, it features names and quotes of famous comic writers and comedians - the majority of whom who performed in Blackpool - and is designed to resemble a music hall showbill. It was commissioned by Blackpool Council and was designed by Gordon Young, with the typography by Why Not Associates.

It is one of the largest pieces of public art to have been commissioned in the United Kingdom.

== Construction ==
The artwork was commissioned by Blackpool Council to fill the new Tower Festival Headland - a 40 by 200 metres (131 ft × 656 ft) events plaza on Blackpool's water front. This space was part of the new promenade seawall being constructed at the time to replace Blackpool's aging Victorian frontage. Production of the artwork began in 2006 and took five years to complete.

Young was inspired to theme the artwork after comedy after he observed how many famous British comedians had photos taken with the Blackpool Tower as a backdrop - confirming to him that Blackpool was a central part of the United Kingdom's comedy culture.

The artwork was created in 320 segments. The granite or blue cobalt concrete lettering was cut out and placed into position with the white concrete poured in around it, and a bespoke studio had to be created to construct the segments. In total, over 160,000 letters were created for the piece, which features over 1000 quotes. The artwork was designed to be viewed both up close (with the use of smaller letters) or from the Blackpool Tower's observation deck (with use of the larger letters). Special concrete had to be developed specifically for the artwork in order for it both to be durable and to retain its bright blue and white colouring.

The artwork was opened by Ken Dodd on 10 October 2011.

== Description ==
=== Layout ===
The piece is split up into 20 rectangular sections, dedicated to comedic quotes from individual comedians, acts and media formats. These include the central area, which consists of five sections dedicated to: Tommy Cooper, Frankie Howerd, Morecambe and Wise, Les Dawson and Ken Dodd respectively. Other sections are dedicated, for example, to Monty Python and The Two Ronnies, and two are for television comedy in general. The outer border is an alphabetical list of comedy entertainers famous in the UK, while the easternmost section (closest to the Blackpool Tower) features Sir Bruce Forsyth's quote "Nice to see you - to see you... nice!" among stars, hearts, and the names of various Blackpool entertainers.

=== Use as a public space ===
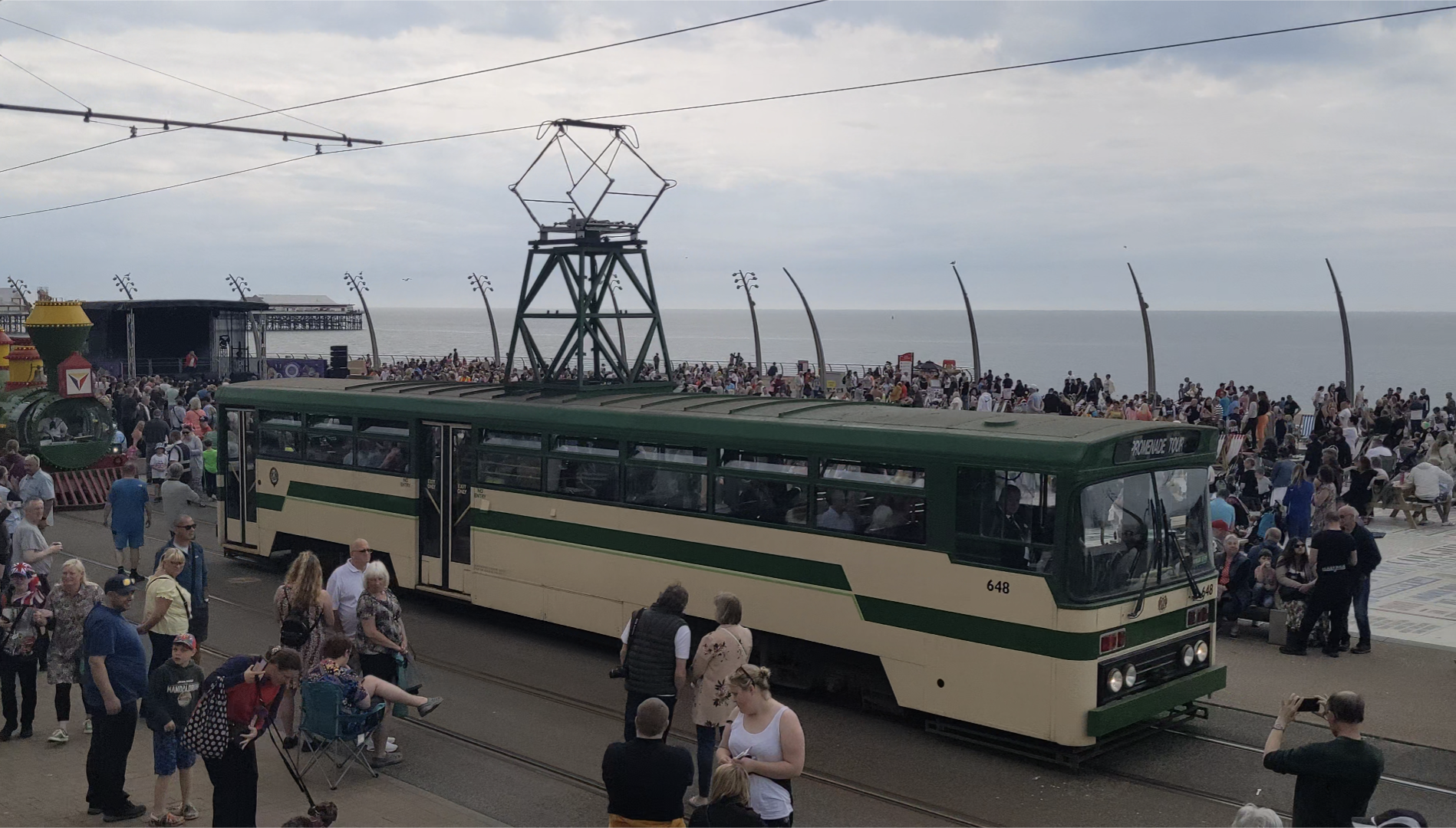
Comedy Carpet being used as a stage during the Platinum Jubilee Celebration Event and Tram Parade in Blackpool, June 2022

As well as acting as a piece of public art, the Comedy Carpet is also used as a major public event space in Blackpool. Since inauguration it, and the wider Tower Festival Headland space, has been used as the location of the Blackpool Illuminations switch-on event, and it has also been a central point of the Illuminations displays - particularly for the art installations during the Lightpool Festival in October.

Other events held on the Comedy Carpet included Blackpool's Platinum Jubilee of Elizabeth II celebrations in 2022 and the King Charles III's Coronation event in 2023. Concerts which have been held there include Elton John's Greatest Hits Tour and Britney Spears' Piece of Me Tour.

From November until January, it is the location of Blackpool's "Christmas By the Sea" Christmas market, and it is also a key viewing area for both the Blackpool Air Show and the World Fireworks Championships.

== Controversies ==
=== Removal of panels ===
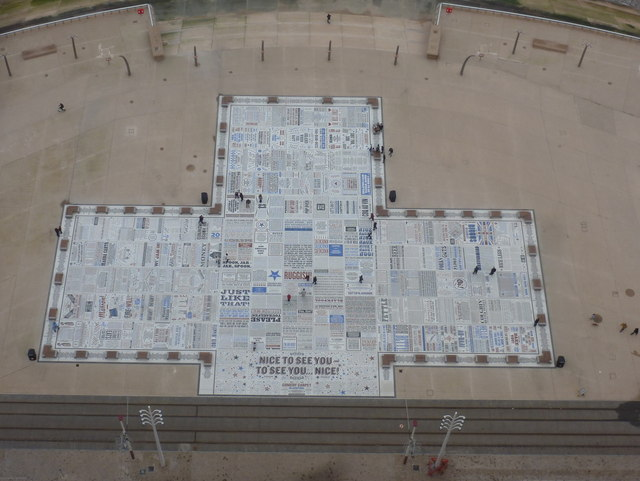
The artwork pictured from Blackpool Tower top in early 2012, with the panels below the "Nice to see you - to see you... nice!" still in place.

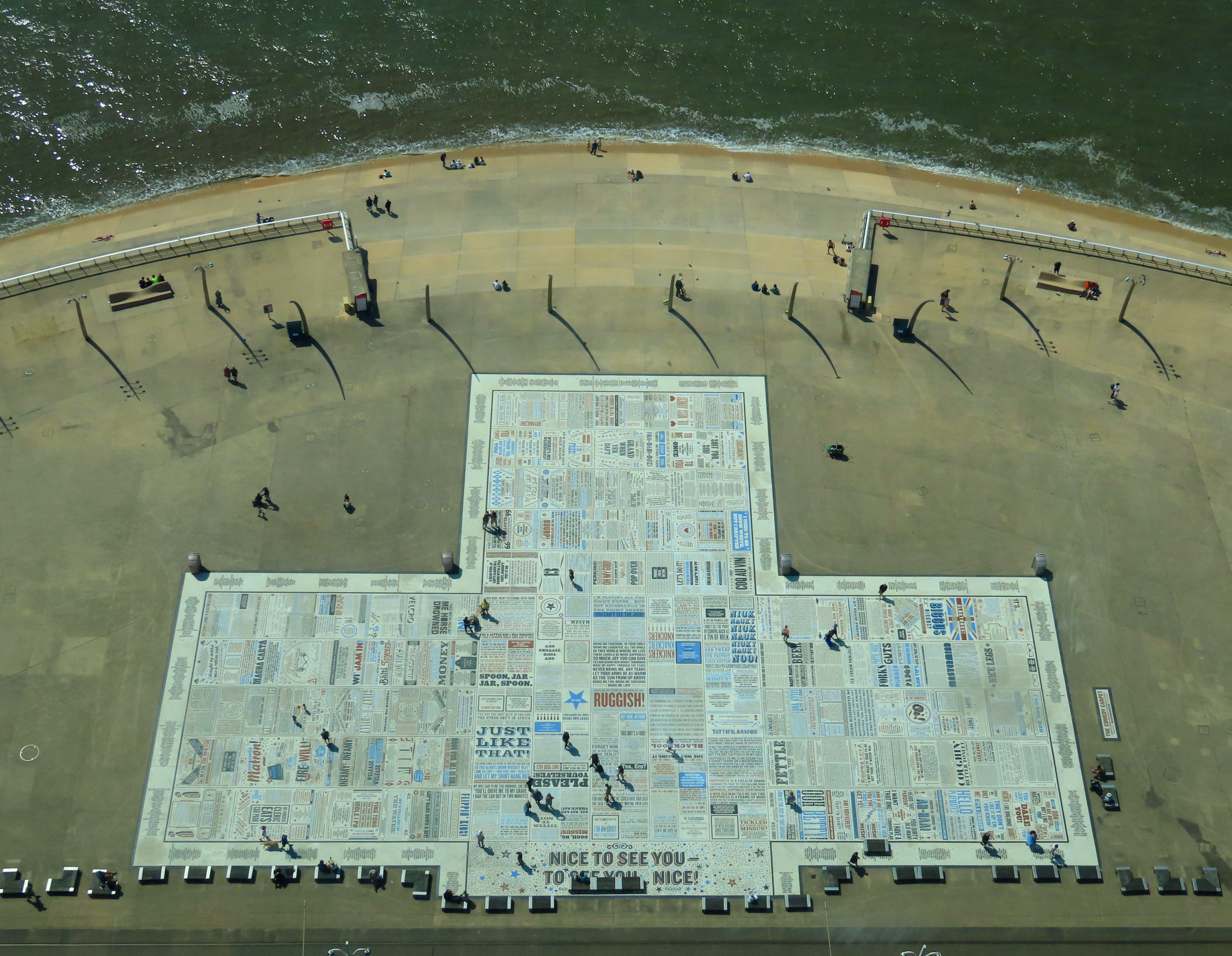
The artwork pictured from the same spot in 2023 with the panels removed, and the artwork title relocated to the north of the piece (to the right in this image).

In March 2012, just five months after opening, a section of the artwork was removed by Blackpool Council. The section - the panels located below Sir Bruce Forsyth's "Nice to see you - to see you... nice!" - was adjacent to the tramway, and was deemed dangerous due to the risk of passersby stepping onto the tramlines to read the words. The section, like those above it, included granite stars, hearts, the names of Blackpool entertainers and the artwork's sponsors. The Blackpool Gazette noted that key names removed as a result included Tower Circus clown Mooky and artwork sponsors Sea Change. The removed section also included the title of the piece, its credits and the opening plaque by Ken Dodd.

Young was described as being "distraught" over the removal:

"I cannot believe the council has done this. Not only have they ruined my artwork and removed the names of so many comedians whose work I wanted to celebrate, but they have even destroyed the dedication stone."
"It was a huge honour to have Ken Dodd unveil the comedy carpet. I am gobsmacked that the council should treat him so shabbily."

While the artwork's title, credits and Ken Dodd opening plaque were replaced adjacent to the structure, the rest of the removed panels have not been replaced.

=== Debate over entertainers included ===
On 5 February 2026, Gordon Young responded to calls for the artwork to be modified to remove the names of since-disgraced entertainers. This was in particular reference to Rolf Harris, who was convicted of sexually assaulting women and children in 2014 after the artwork had been installed. This was not the first time that the debate had arisen, as it had been first raised 11 years prior shortly after Harris' conviction.

Young dismissed modifying the artwork, saying that he did not agree with the idea of changing art:

"I agree that what Rolf Harris did was despicable and I do sympathise with what the gentleman has said, but I can't agree with this thing we have now, where some people start trying to change works of art because we've decided we don't like the people who made them."

Young added that he made the decision not to take into consideration moral standings of each entertainer when creating the piece - "If you start doing that, where does it end?".

== Awards ==
The Comedy Carpet has been awarded the following:

Awarding Body	Year	Prize
Blackpool Civic Trust Awards	2011	Best Public Realm Award
Marsh Charitable Trust	2012	Marsh Award for Excellence in Public Sculpture (Awarded to Gordon Young)
Tokyo Type Directors Club	2012	Grand Prize
Drum Design Awards	2013	Grand Prix
