= Sarah Myerscough =

English artist and sculptor

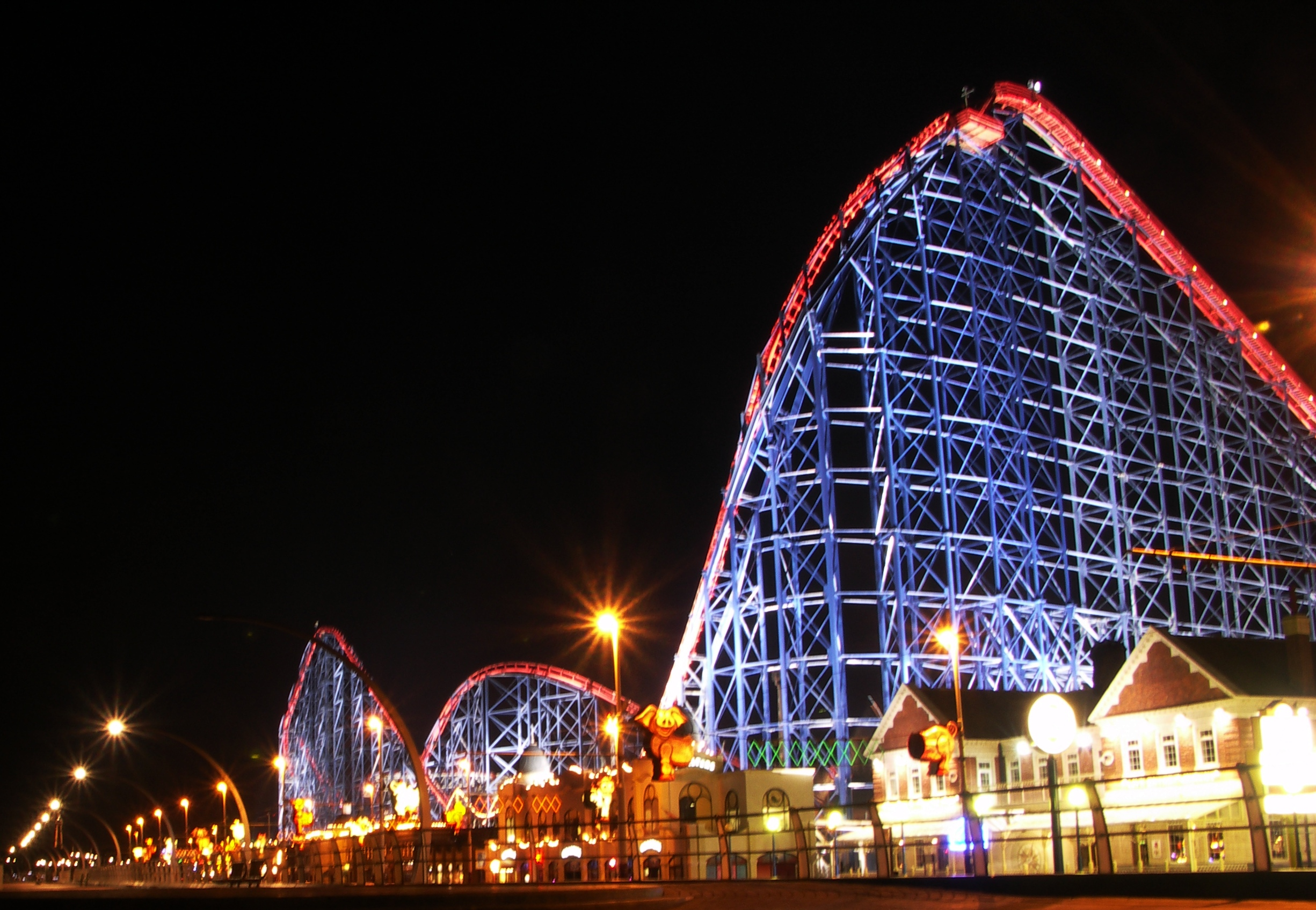
- Blackpool Illuminations lit up outside Blackpool Pleasure Beach
- Education: Lancaster University
- Known for: Graphic design, sculpture, painting

Sarah Myerscough (pronounced Myers/co) is an English artist and sculptor, based in Blackpool, Lancashire.

== Background ==
Myerscough attended St Mary's Sixth Form College, Blackpool from 1996 to 1998, where she gained an A-level in Art and Design. She then gained a BTEC Foundation National Diploma in Art and Design at Blackpool and The Fylde College in 1999 and spent the next three years at Lancaster University where, in 2002, she gained a Bachelor of Arts (Hons) in Fine art: Practice and Theory. In June 2002 her work featured in the Student Degree Show at the Peter Scott Gallery.

== Career ==
After graduating from Lancaster University in 2002, she started work in March 2003 as a model maker and artist at Blackpool Pleasure Beach, where she designed and created sculptures for rides as well as decorating shops and restaurants within the park with murals and sculptures. In October and November, her work was featured in a joint exhibition with three colleagues from the Pleasure Beach, "Art in the Making Exhibition" at the Globe Gallery.

In June 2005 she started working as an artist for Blackpool Illuminations. The first Illuminations feature that Myerscough worked on was the Ali Baba tableau in 2005. In 2006 she helped remake the Alice in Wonderland tableau as well as painting a sponsorship board for the North West Air Ambulance charity and also work on two more tableau's - Fire and Water and Pirate.

In 2007 she designed and painted a new back scene for the Egyptian Tableau and Local Heads, a new section which features photographs of local people (including one of Myerscough). In 2008 she extended the Doctor Who section with new pictures and 3-D models.

She also worked with interior designer and television personality Laurence Llewelyn-Bowen when he designed two new features, the "Decodance" road feature in 2007, for which she carved and painted half of the figures and then in 2008 the "Venus Reborn" tableau which has water fountains as well as lighting and classical music. It was the first theatre tableau to be created, with a 15-minute show of sound, light and water effects.

== Gallery ==
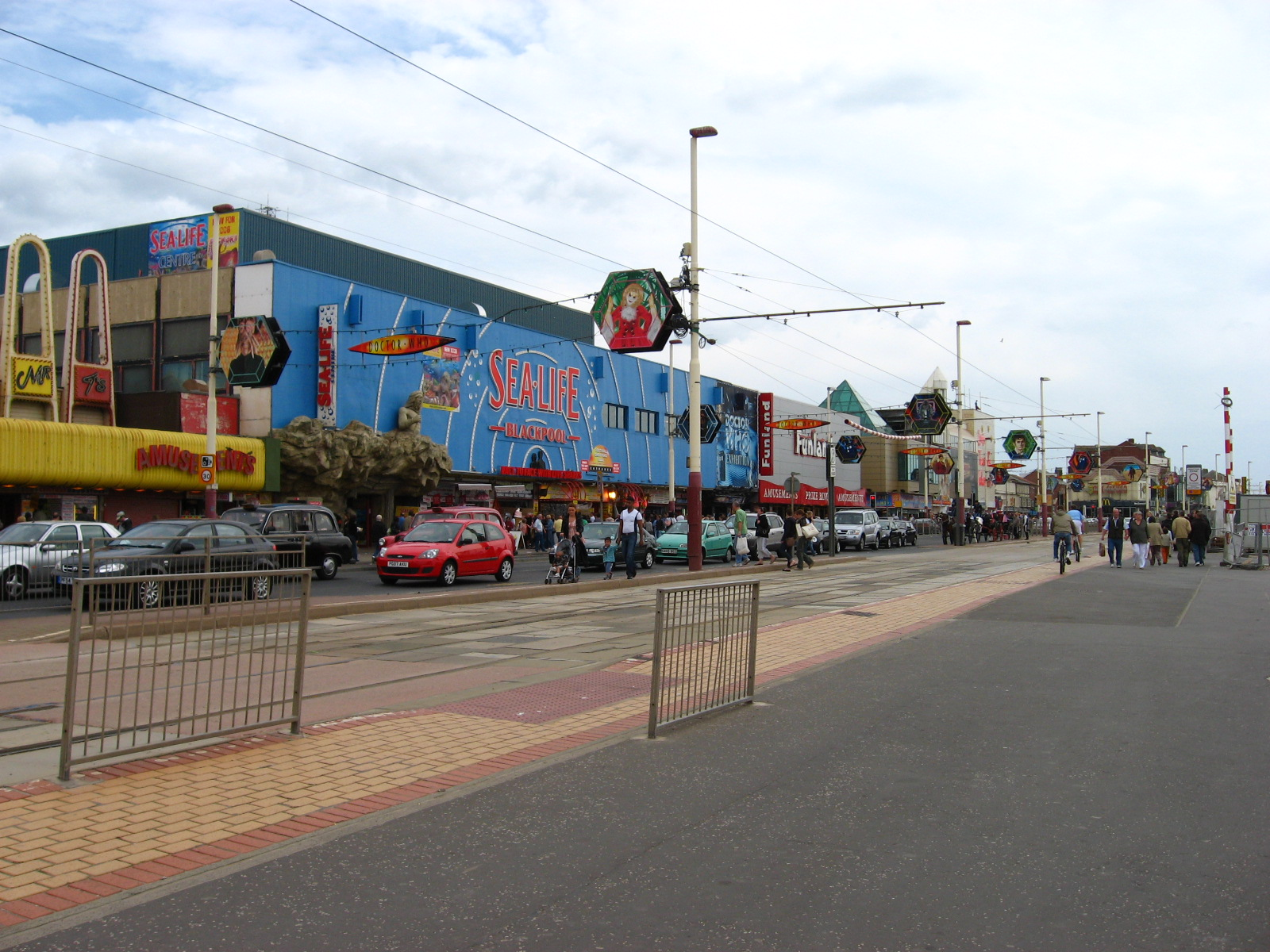
Dr Who - Illuminations outside Blackpool Sea-Life Centre - © GNU

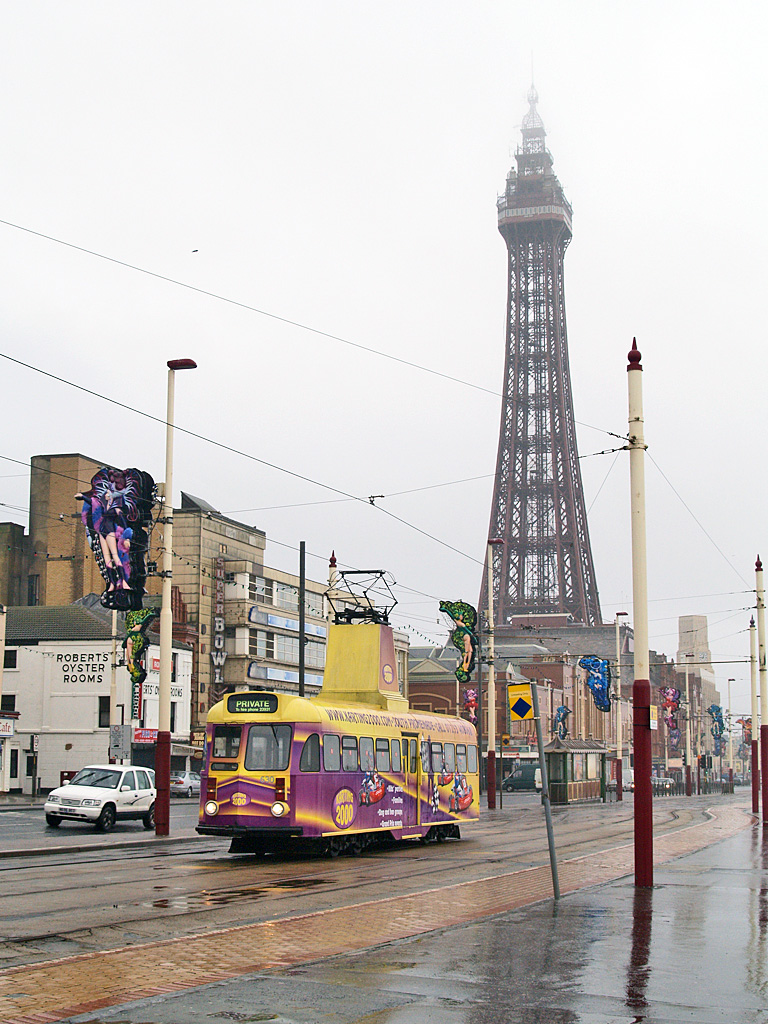
Decodance - Illuminations in front of Blackpool Tower - © David Ingham

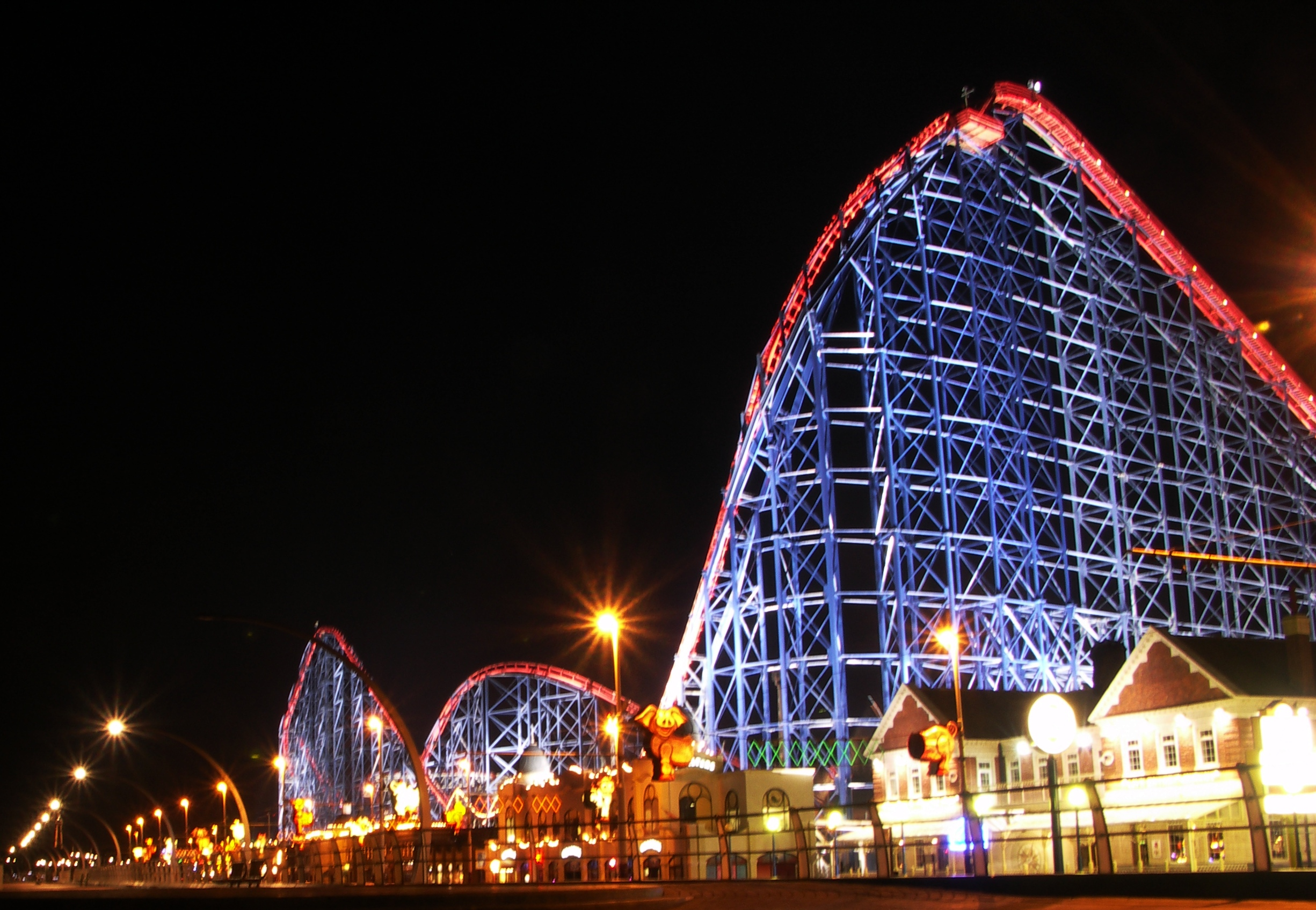
Concertina Critters - Illuminations in front of Blackpool Pleasure Beach - © Henry Brett
