= Sirene (barque) =

History

Norway
- Name: Sirene
- Fate: Wrecked 9 October 1892

General characteristics
- Displacement: 667 tons
- Propulsion: Sails
- Sail plan: Barque
- Crew: 11

Sirene was a Norwegian barque that was wrecked against Blackpool's North Pier on 9 October 1892.

== Wreck ==
Sirene was sailing from Fleetwood, Lancashire, England, to Florida in the United States when she was caught in a storm on 9 October 1892 and ended up wrecked alongside North Pier, Blackpool, Lancashire. All eleven crew members jumped from the ship onto the pier and were saved.
