= Blackpool and The Fylde College =

Further and higher education college in Blackpool, UK

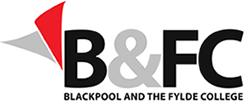
- Established: 1892
- Principal: Alun Francis
- Location: Blackpool, Lancashire, England, UK
- Campus: Bispham, University Centre, Gateway, Fleetwood Nautical, Lancashire Energy HQ
- Website: www.blackpool.ac.uk

Blackpool and The Fylde College (B&FC) is a further and higher education college in Blackpool, Lancashire, England.

The college is a Regional Teaching Partner of Lancaster University and offers full and part-time further education, higher education and vocational courses along with apprenticeships. From September 2016 the college also holds its own foundation degree awarding powers.

Facilities include four main campuses located across the Fylde Coast. The sites in Fleetwood form a specialised Nautical campus, which teaches courses for merchant seafarers and offshore workers. As well as delivering a broad portfolio of accredited safety, survival and fire training courses, qualifications are also awarded by the Scottish Qualifications Authority, Lancaster University as well as the college itself.

== History ==
In Fleetwood, a school for fisherman was opened in 1892. The history of B&FC dates back to 1892's opening of Fleetwood's School for Fishermen, which later developed into the Nautical campus. A technical college was built in 1936. Blackpool Technical College (B&FC's Palatine Road site, later expanded into Blackpool Technical College and School of Art) opened in 1937, and expanded again to include the Bispham site c.1970 (Hall, A Hundred Years of Blackpool Education, Blackpool Education Committee, 1970). The Fleetwood and Blackpool colleges combined into B&FC in 1987. In 1987, the nautical college merged with Blackpool and Fylde College, becoming Blackpool and The Fylde College.

The college's Lytham site has been converted to provide sixth form facilities, in conjunction with Lytham St Annes Technology and Performing Arts College. In 2009, it opened a new facility. In 2013, it had four main campuses and 70 learning centers. It had around 16,000 students.

In 2025, it had 9 locations listed on its website. Also in 2025, the city of Blackpool finalized a plan to begin construction on a new campus for the university in its town centre, meant to bring up to 3,000 people and set to open in 2027. The city had started purchasing land for the project in 2024, with both Blackpool and the Fylde College and Lancaster University to use the buildings.

== Campuses ==
- Bispham
- Gateway
- Fleetwood Nautical
- Seasiders Learning
- University Centre
- Lancashire Energy HQ

== Students' Union ==
B&FC Students' Union is affiliated with the NUS and works in partnership with the college. The SU represents students on a range of issues, including equality and diversity, education and social activities.

== Institute of Technology ==
Located across England, IoTs are a national network of partnerships between local colleges, universities and leading employers of which B&FC is now a part of. Backed by a £290 million government investment, IoTs deliver the high quality technical education, providing skills-based training for careers across multiple technical industries.

B&FC as of 2023 was a partner with Lancashire and Cumbria's Institute of Technology, delivering a variety of technical IoT courses.

== Alumni ==
- Ian Anderson, rock musician
- Peter Baynham, comedian and screenwriter
- Kate Ford, actress
- Craig McDean, photographer
- Sarah Myerscough, model maker / artist for Blackpool Illuminations, previously at Blackpool Pleasure Beach
- Helen Owen, theatre actress
- Craig Parkinson, actor
- Stephen Partridge, video artist
- Jodie Prenger, actress and singer
- John Simm, actor

== See also ==
- List of UCAS institutions
