= Gordon Young (artist) =

British artist (born 1952)

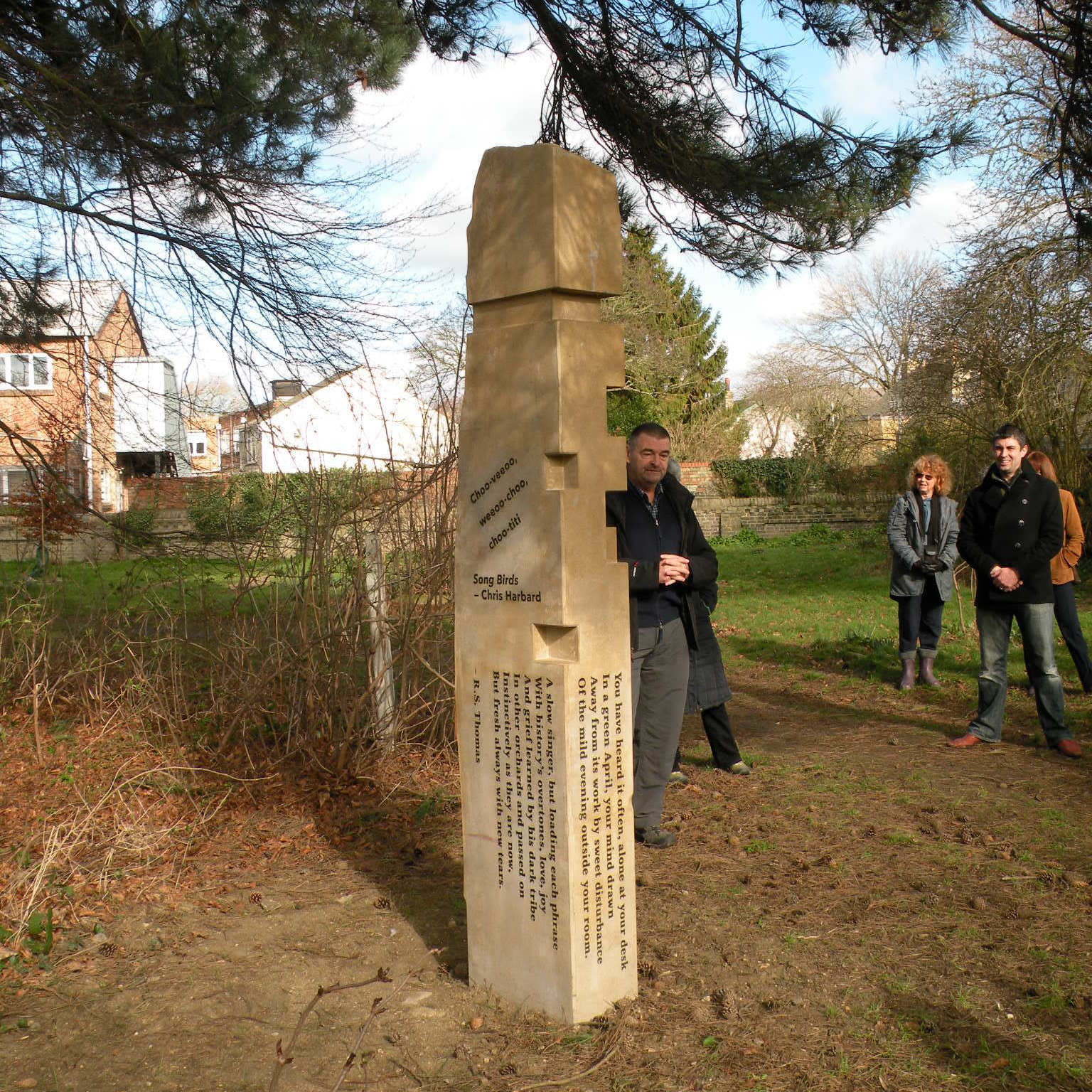
Gordon Young with one of the Bird Stone sculptures, Cambridge

Young's voice
recorded 12 February 2015

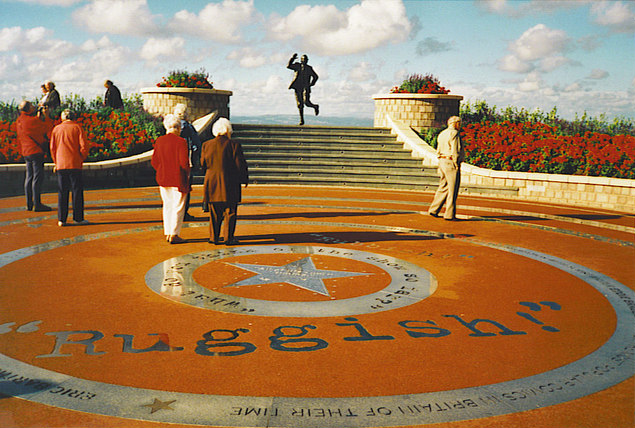
The Eric Morecambe memorial area, Morecambe

Gordon Young (born 1952) is a British artist specialising in public art, often including typographical elements. His Comedy Carpet on Blackpool Promenade (2011), at 2,200m^{2}, is one of the UK's largest pieces of public art.

== Early life ==
Young was born in Carlisle, Cumbria, in 1952 and trained at Coventry Polytechnic and at the Royal College of Art. He was curator of the Yorkshire Sculpture Park and director of the Welsh Sculpture Trust before becoming a full-time artist in 1984.

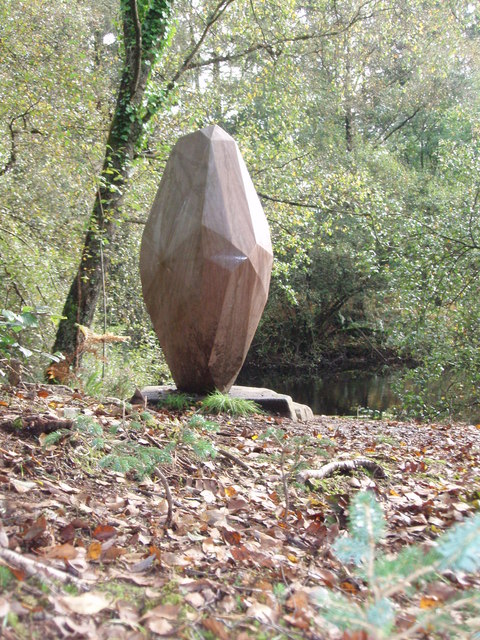
The Gem Stane, one of seven works on the 7stane mountain bike routes, Scotland

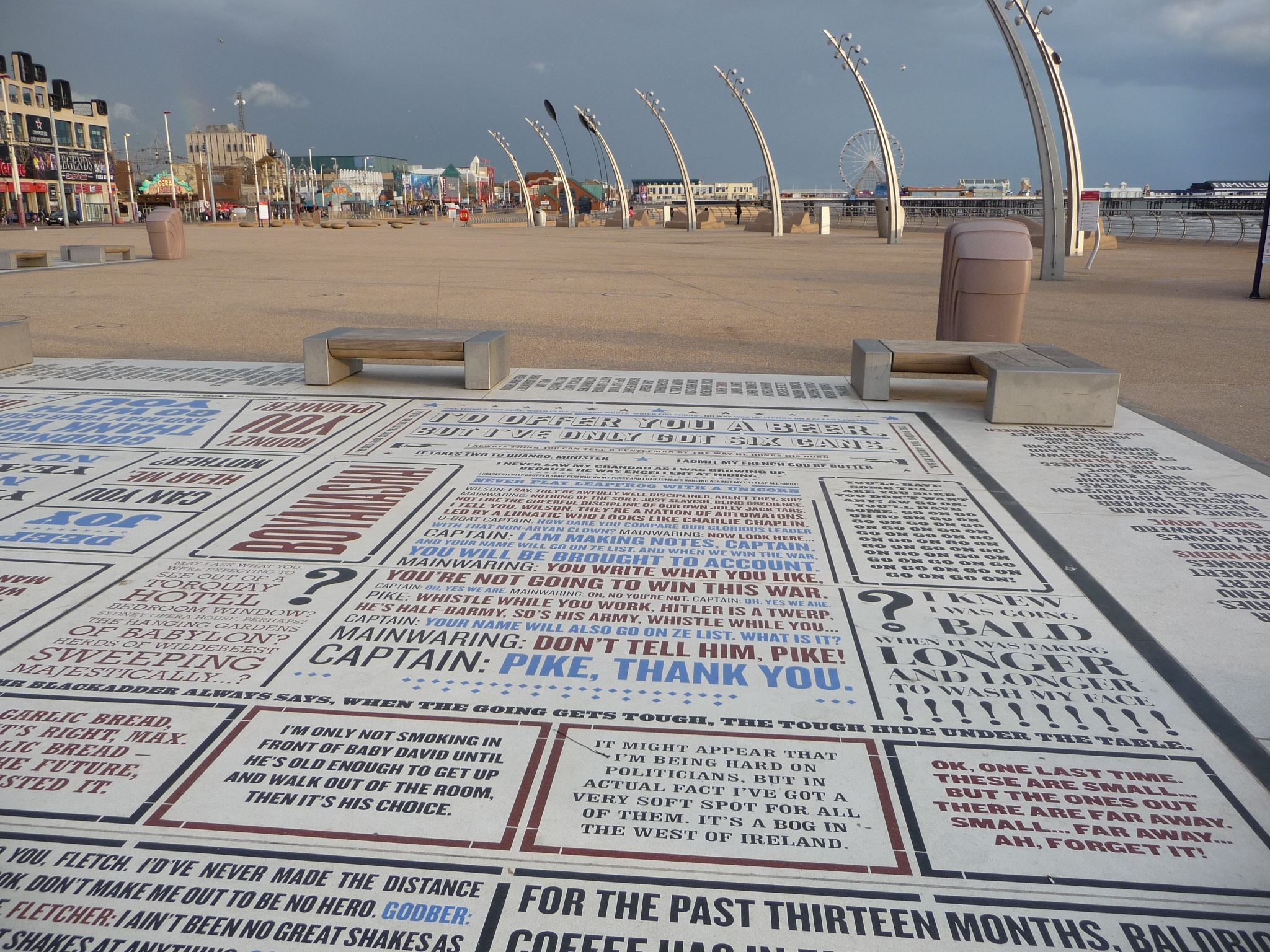
The Comedy Carpet on Blackpool promenade

== Works ==
Young's works include:

- Fish Pavement (1992), Hull: a trail of 40 lifesize fish or groups of fish inset into pavements, leading the visitor around this city with its fishing heritage. They include a plaice in the Market Place, monkfish at Blackfriars Gate, and a shark outside a bank. Renovated in 2000.
- Cursing Stone and Reiver Pavement (2001), Carlisle: a walkway (connecting Tullie House Museum to Carlisle Castle under a main road) showing the names of border reiver families, and a 14-ton granite boulder showing part of a curse against these families which bishop Gavin Dunbar caused to be read out in churches in 1525.
- A Flock of Words (2002), Morecambe: a 300m pathway linking the railway station to the sea front, with proverbs and poems about birds set into the paving
- 7stanes (2008), Southern Scotland: a stone at each of seven mountain bike trails (including the Border Stane near the border, which has Auld Lang Syne and Jerusalem on its two sides with a hole in the middle through which hands can be shaken).
- Comedy Carpet (2011), Blackpool: an area of 2,200m^{2} or 1,800m^{2} (sources vary) on Festival Headland on Blackpool Promenade, opposite Blackpool Tower: among the largest pieces of public art to have been commissioned in the United Kingdom. It shows jokes and punchlines from comedians who have performed in Blackpool over the decades, totalling 160,000 letters. Each letter is cut from granite and inset in white concrete, in a variety of typefaces. Five months after it was opened, the local council controversially removed part of the work because viewers were thought to be in danger of stepping backwards into the path of trams. The work earned Young the 2012 Marsh Award for Excellence in Public Sculpture. and in 2014 was joint winner of the International Society of Typographic Designers' International Typographic Award,
- Bird Stones (2014), Mill Road Cemetery, Cambridge: one wood and six stone pieces inspired by bird song.
- Radioactive Art (2017): a BBC Radio 4 programme about art to mark sites of radioactive waste storage.
- Ealing Rock (2018): stone sculpture in Elizabeth Square, Ealing, west London, bearing words from George Formby's song "Count your Blessings and Smile" from the 1940 film Let George Do It!, filmed at Ealing Studios.
- Down to earth (commissioned 2019): seven globes of brick with text, as part of Canal to Creek a public art project associated with the WestConnex road scheme in Sydney, Australia.
- Stan Shaw Memorial (2022): plaque commemorating Sheffield knife-maker Stan Shaw, outside Cutlers' Hall
