= Gynn Square =

Square in Blackpool, England

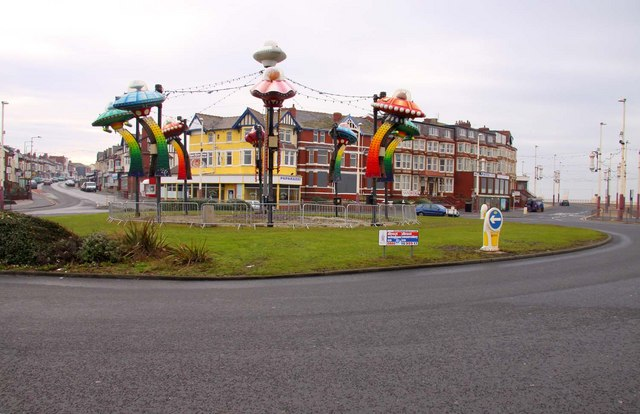
- Pictured in 2009, looking south to Dickson Road (left) and the Promenade
- Maintained by: Blackpool Borough Council
- Location: Blackpool, Lancashire, England
- Coordinates: 53.83287°N 3.054589°W
- North: Queen's Promenade
- East: Warbreck Hill Road
- South: Promenade; and: Dickson Road

Gynn Square is a former public square in the North Shore area of Blackpool, Lancashire, England. Now a roundabout, it is a meeting point of Queen's Promenade, the Promenade (both part of the A584), Warbreck Hill Road (B5265) and Dickson Road.

Blackpool Transport's Gynn Square tram stop is located a few yards to the north, on the Promenade. Tram services between Gynn Square and Fleetwood began in 1898. Gynn Square is also served by Blackpool Transport's routes 1 and 2 and Transpora North West's route 21.

The Gynn Inn stood at Gynn Square in the 18th and 19th centuries. It was demolished in August 1921. The Gynn Hotel was built nearby in 1939, replacing the Duke of Cambridge Hotel. The Gynn public house overlooks the roundabout from its eastern side.

In 1941, during World War II, one of the mines placed in the Irish Sea exploded, causing damage to Gynn Square.

In 2020, a Spitfire was placed in the centre of the roundabout as part of that year's Blackpool Illuminations.
