= Blackpool Illuminations =

Annual lights festival in Blackpool, Lancashire, England

Coordinates: 53°49′08″N 3°03′21″W

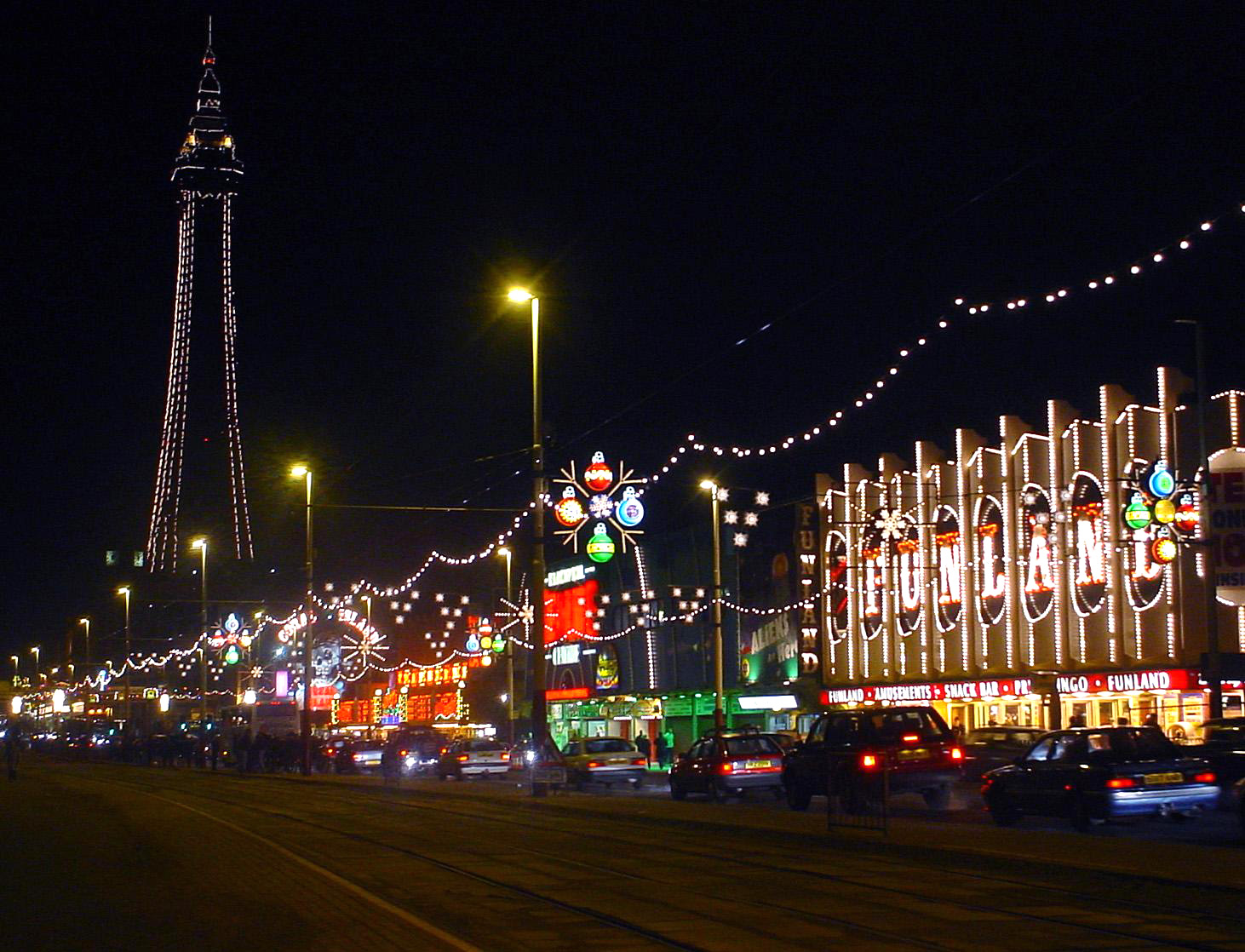
- Illuminations along Blackpool Promenade with the Blackpool Tower in the background.
- Dates: late August – early January
- Locations: Blackpool, Lancashire, England
- Years active: since 1879

Blackpool Illuminations is an annual lights festival that started on 18 September 1879, held each autumn in the British seaside resort of Blackpool on the Fylde Coast in Lancashire. Also known locally as The Lights or The Illuminations, they ran each year for 66 days from late August until early November, extended to over 100 days to run until after the Christmas and New Year holidays from 2020, at a time when most other English seaside resorts' seasons had come to an end; for example, Friday 30 August 2024 to Sunday 5 January 2025, and Friday 29 August 2025 to Sunday 4 January 2026.

The Illuminations are approximately 5 miles (8 km) long and use over one million bulbs, now using LED technology, micro controllers, lasers and video. The display stretches along the Promenade from Starr Gate at the south end of the town to Red Bank Rd Bispham in the north.

== History ==
The Illuminations were first shown in 1879 when they were described as 'Artificial sunshine', and consisted of just eight carbon arc lamps—twelve months before Thomas Edison patented the electric light bulb—which bathed the Promenade. The first display similar to the modern-day displays was held in May 1912 to mark the first British royal family visit to Blackpool when Princess Louise opened a new section of the Promenade, Princess Parade. The Promenade was decorated with what was described as "festoons of garland lamps" using about 10,000 light bulbs. The local chamber of trade as well as other local businesses requested Blackpool Council to stage the event in September of the same year. The subsequent event was such a success that in 1913 the council were again asked to stage the Princess Parade lights as an end of season event. With the outbreak of the First World War there were no further displays until 1925 when the lights were again on display and extended to run from Manchester Square to Cocker Square. In 1932 animated tableaux were erected running along the cliffs from North Shore to Bispham, and the Illuminations were extended to its current length running from Starr Gate to Red Bank Road at Bispham.

In 1935 the Mayor of Blackpool, Alderman George Whittaker was due to perform the Switch-on ceremony. When he met Railway Queen Audrey Mosson, 15, he asked her to take his place. Fifty years later, in 1985, Audrey was invited back to perform the ceremony with actress Joanna Lumley.

The Illuminations were ready to shine in 1939 but the outbreak of the Second World War again interrupted the annual display and post war austerity meant the lights were not switched on again until 1949.

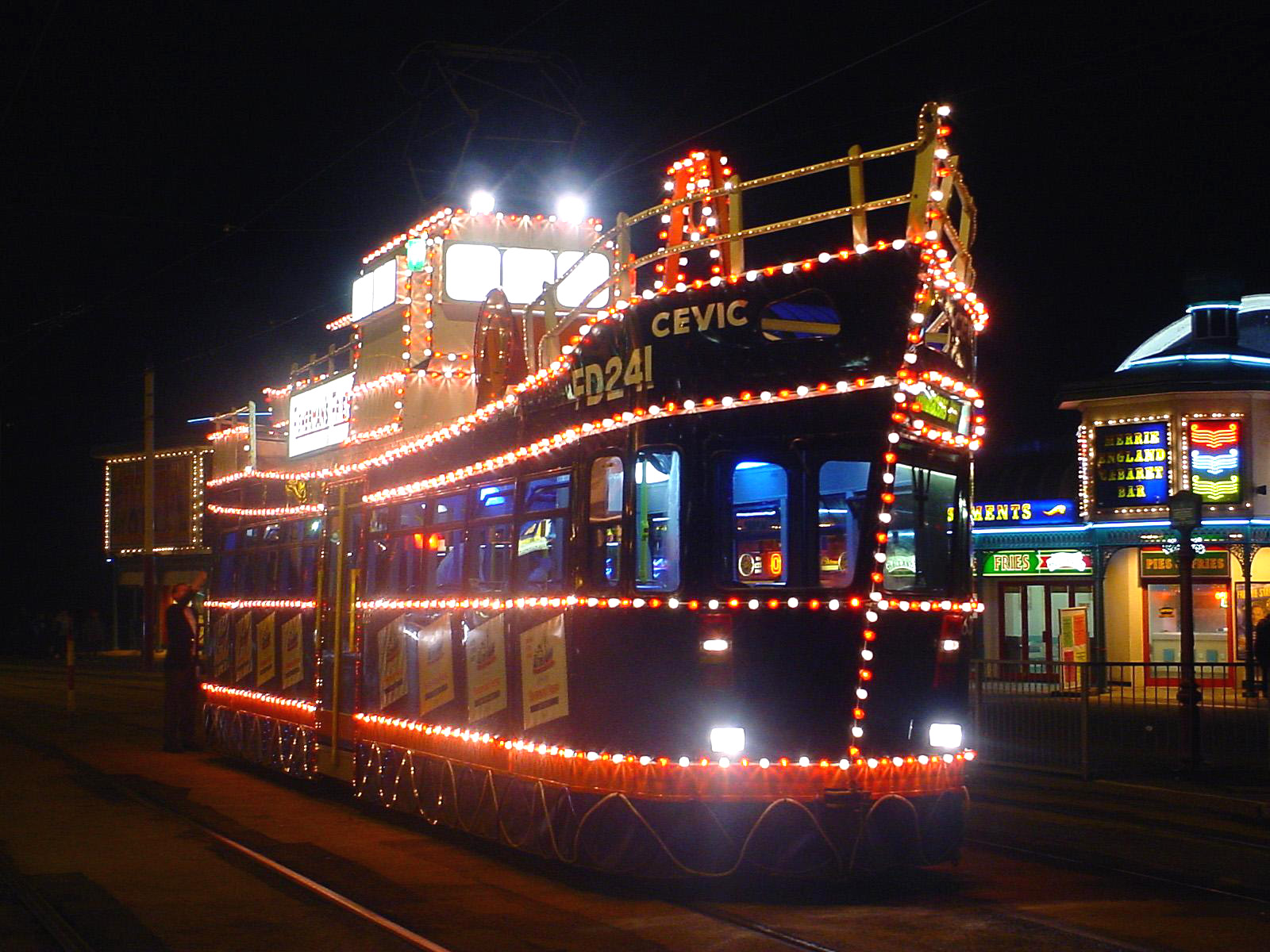
Illuminated tram on Blackpool promenade

Every year there is also the Festival of Light which features interactive installations and is described as being "a contemporary look at the concept of light and art working together to create entertainment". In the 1950s the Lights of Leamington Festival in Leamington Spa, Warwickshire, was said to rival the Blackpool Illuminations, but they only ran until 1961.

== Popularity ==
Every year people visit Blackpool specifically for the Illuminations, but visitors mostly come from the north of England, the north-west in particular, and Scotland; southern-England based Illuminations designer Laurence Llewelyn-Bowen said that the appeal of the lights had not spread widely south of the Midlands, speaking of "a bit of a north-south divide".

== Switch-on ==
Each year the opening night of the Illuminations, The Big Switch On, held in a specially erected arena with a celebrity pulling a switch to turn on the six miles of lights. The first switch-on ceremony was held in 1934 when Lord Derby flicked the switch to turn on the Illuminations. In 1993 BBC Radio 1 first broadcast the switch-on ceremony live when Status Quo were the guest celebrities, before in 1997 BBC Radio 2 started to cover it which continued until 2010, when GMG Radio, under its Real Radio and Smooth Radio brands took over the broadcasting of the switch on. Each year one main celebrity pulls the switch while there are performances in the Radio 2 arena with a pre-switch-on concert featuring pop bands, singers and comedians.

== Modern-day Illuminations ==
Most visitors drive through the Illuminations by car, coach or bus. There are also open top trams which run along the tramway as well as horse-drawn landau. At Bispham there is a special walkway for the tableaux which also includes mixed media in the various large tableaux displays. As of 2025 the annual Illuminations cost was £2.4M.

For the 2007 Illuminations, interior designer Laurence Llewelyn-Bowen, who has made appearances on the BBC television programme Changing Rooms, was commissioned to create a special feature on the Central Promenade outside Blackpool Tower, named Decodance. Llewelyn-Bowen had stated that he fell in love with what he called "Blackpool's high-kicking glamour and historical reputation for giddy glitz" while filming for the Holiday programme. His involvement continued; as of 2025 Llewelyn-Bowen had been involved with the Illuminations for 20 years, and was preparing a new dragons-based installation, Guardians of the North, for 2025/2026.

The displays at the cliffs from North Shore to Bispham contain forty large tableaux holding more than 5,000 square metres in surface area. There is a pedestrian walkway running the length of the tableaux displays which are set back from the Promenade beyond the tramway. Blackpool Tramway runs along the entire length of the Illuminations and there are over one million lamps in the display. In 2007 the Egyptian tableau which includes Egyptian sarcophagus, which eerily opens to reveal a mummified secret, returned after an overhaul. Also at Bispham on the clifftop was a new BBC Portal video screen.

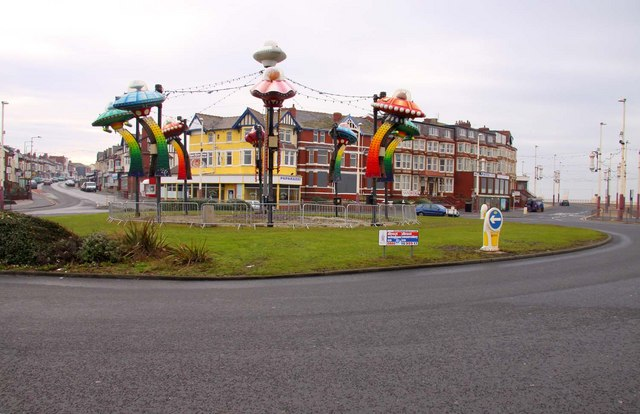
Gynn Square

Also in 2007 a new Doctor Who display appeared with monsters from the last three series of the show. At Gynn Square on Gynn Island, a Space Invasion with an opalescent mothership hovering more than 40 ft in the air, battling it out with eight spaceships arranged in formation defending their territory. The display which used colour-changing LEDs, was created from the popular alien craft which used to adorn the Promenade.

In October 2007, a laser beam installed on the tower for the duration of the annual Illuminations was criticised by astronomer and presenter of The Sky at Night television programme, Patrick Moore who said, "Light pollution is a huge problem. I am not saying we should turn all the lights out, that is not practical, but there are some things which are very unnecessary. The Blackpool Tower light is certainly something I do not think we should be doing. I very much oppose it." The beam could be seen 30 miles away. Moore called for the beam to be stopped. The Centre for Astrophysics at the University of Central Lancashire in Preston said the laser has added to a "spiralling problem" affecting astronomy, as astronomical research is increasing carried out at sites outside Europe due to light pollution.

At the sixth annual Banquet and Ball on 9 January 2008, organised by the holiday trade umbrella group, Blackpool Combined Association, to raise funds for the Lights, the new Head of Illuminations, Michael Wilcock revealed new plans for the future of the Illuminations.

=== Blackpool Festival of Lights ===
Each year in conjunction with the Illuminations the Blackpool Festival of Light, a fusion of art and light events and installations, is staged. In 2007 the Festival started on 31 August with various lighting displays throughout the town with displays by artists and also Blackpool and The Fylde College. These included a mixed media display entitled "Donkey Fest" on the cliffs at North Shore, "Water is Everywhere" by Creatmosphere at the Water Tower in North Shore which was an architectural light projection depicting moving water reflections, animating and highlighting the Water Tower building. Also, "Hypodoché" by artist Ann Carragher, an expression of the artists personal relationship between life, natural processes, and the female 'space & voice' of architecture throughout the ages. The light installation consisted of water and light was exhibited at a town centre art gallery. Also there was the United Kingdom's first Illuminated Art Car Parade on 21 October as well as the return of the Honda Goldwing Light Parade.

=== Illuminated cars ===
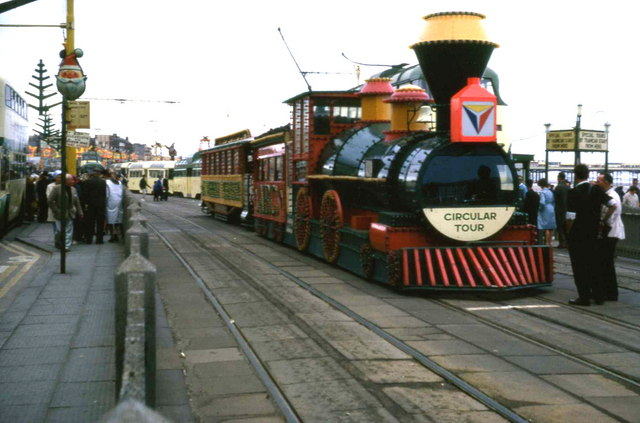
Illuminated Western Train Tramcar

There are a variety of rebuilt single deck cars, of different designs, all of which were rebuilt as illuminated theme trams. These run along the illuminated part of the Promenade during the Illuminations. A campaign by the local newspaper, the Blackpool Gazette in 2006 to get one of the Illuminated trams, Western Train, back on track, resulted in a £278,000 Heritage Lottery Fund grant to restore the tramcar which first ran in 1962. It was withdrawn from service in 1999 and had stood derelict at the Rigby Road depot. The tramcar is due to return during the Illuminations Switch-On in 2008. In January 2008 it was revealed that another iconic illuminated tram, the Rocket tram, which had been in service between 1961 and 1999 but which had since then stood idle, is also due to be restored with expectation being that it would return to service for the Illuminations in 2009 at a cost of about £150,000 and with the help of the Friends of the Illuminations group.

=== Construction and energy ===
It takes twenty two weeks for all the lights to be erected in time for the Switch-on each year and nine weeks to dismantle them after the display has finished. Most of the display is now operated on low voltage (12 V and 24 V) and in 2003 the Illuminations cut electricity consumption by 11% using new technology. Then in 2004 wind turbines at the Solarium on New South Promenade contributed to powering the Illuminations for the first time.

The Illuminations now only use green electricity from renewable resources, comprising wind power, small-scale hydropower and biogas. The aim was for the display to be carbon neutral by 2010.

=== Friends of the Illuminations ===
In January 2008 Blackpool Council announced plans to start a Friends of the Illuminations stating that they saw the future of the Illuminations as being more interactive, and that "the group would help us shape the future of one of the country's best, free attractions." and would also encourage worldwide support.

=== Blackpool Christmas Lights ===
Separate from the Illuminations, as part of the Festival of Light, Blackpool Christmas Lights are switched on every year in November in a very similar fashion to the Illuminations. They are located on various streets leading out of The Promenade. On Christmas Eve, and New Year's Eve, the Illuminations are switched on non-commercially to accompany the Christmas Lights.

== Artists and designers ==
- Emilios Hatjoullis – Designer: Tableaux displays of nursery rhymes (1960s)
- Graham Ogden – Designer: 23 November 1987 until 31 January 2007
- Laurence Llewelyn-Bowen – Creative Director/Designer: Decodance, Venus Reborn, Fear The Glampire, Fountainsy Island, DinoDoom, Theatre D'Amour, Bling, Diamonds Are A Queen's Best Friend (Jubilee Tableau) (2007, 2008, 2010, 2011, 2012)
- Andy McKeown – Designer: Local Heads (2008), Famous Heads (2011)
- Sarah Myerscough – Artist: Concertina Critters, Dr Who, Venus Reborn, Egyptian Tableau, Decodance, Alice in Wonderland, Pirate Tableau, Ali Baba (2005 – )

== See also ==
- A584 road
- Festivals in the United Kingdom
- Festival of Lights (disambiguation)
