= Central Pier, Blackpool =

Pier in Blackpool, England

Central Pier
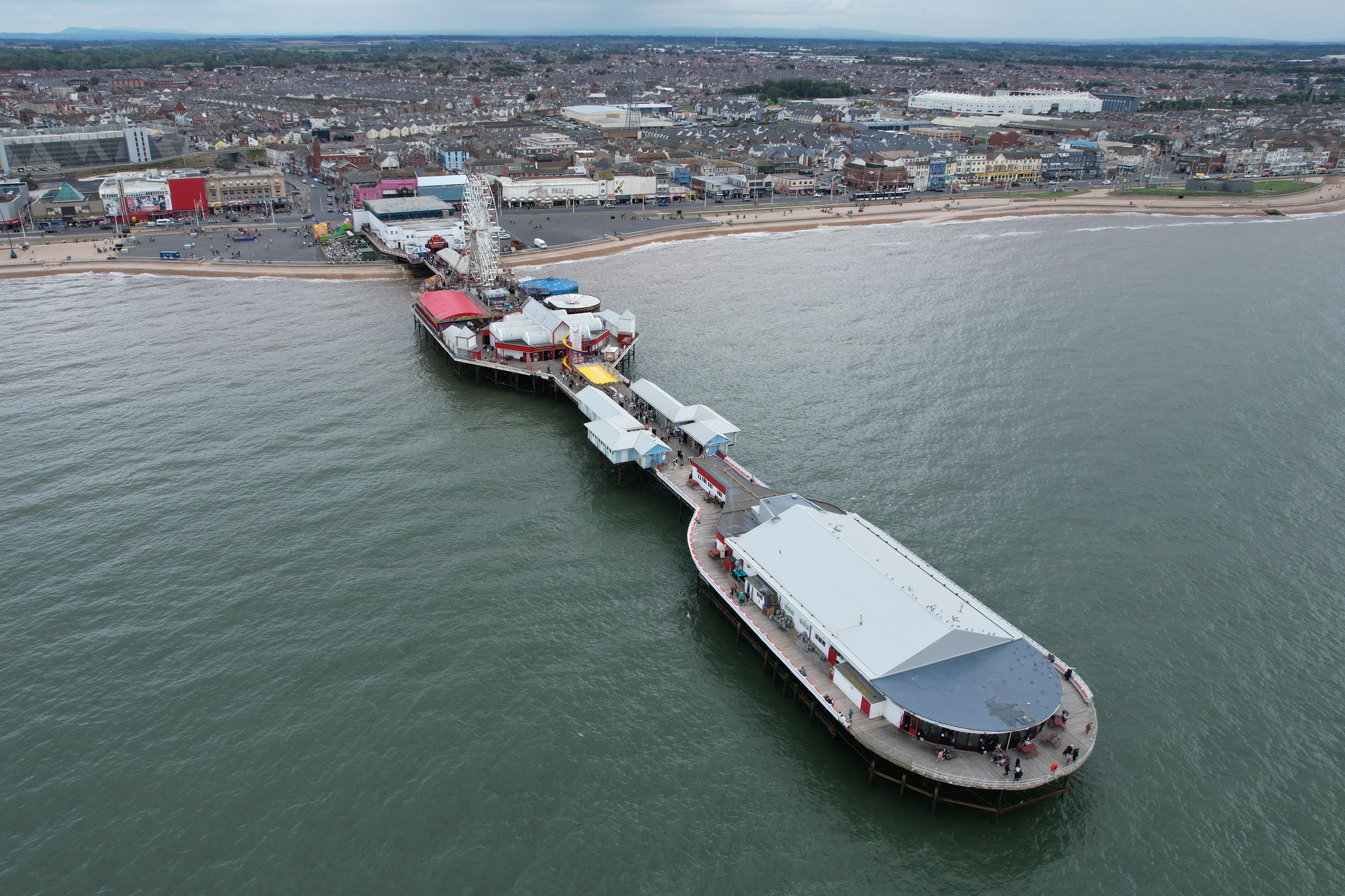
- Central Pier as of August 2026
- Type: Pleasure Pier
- Coordinates: 53.8109°N 3.0583°W
- Official name: Central Pier

Characteristics
- Total length: 371 yards (339 m)

History
- Designer: John Isaac Mawson
- Constructor: Blackpool South Jetty Company
- Opening date: 30 May 1868
- Location in Blackpool

Central Pier is one of three piers in the town of Blackpool, England, and was built in 1868.

== Location ==
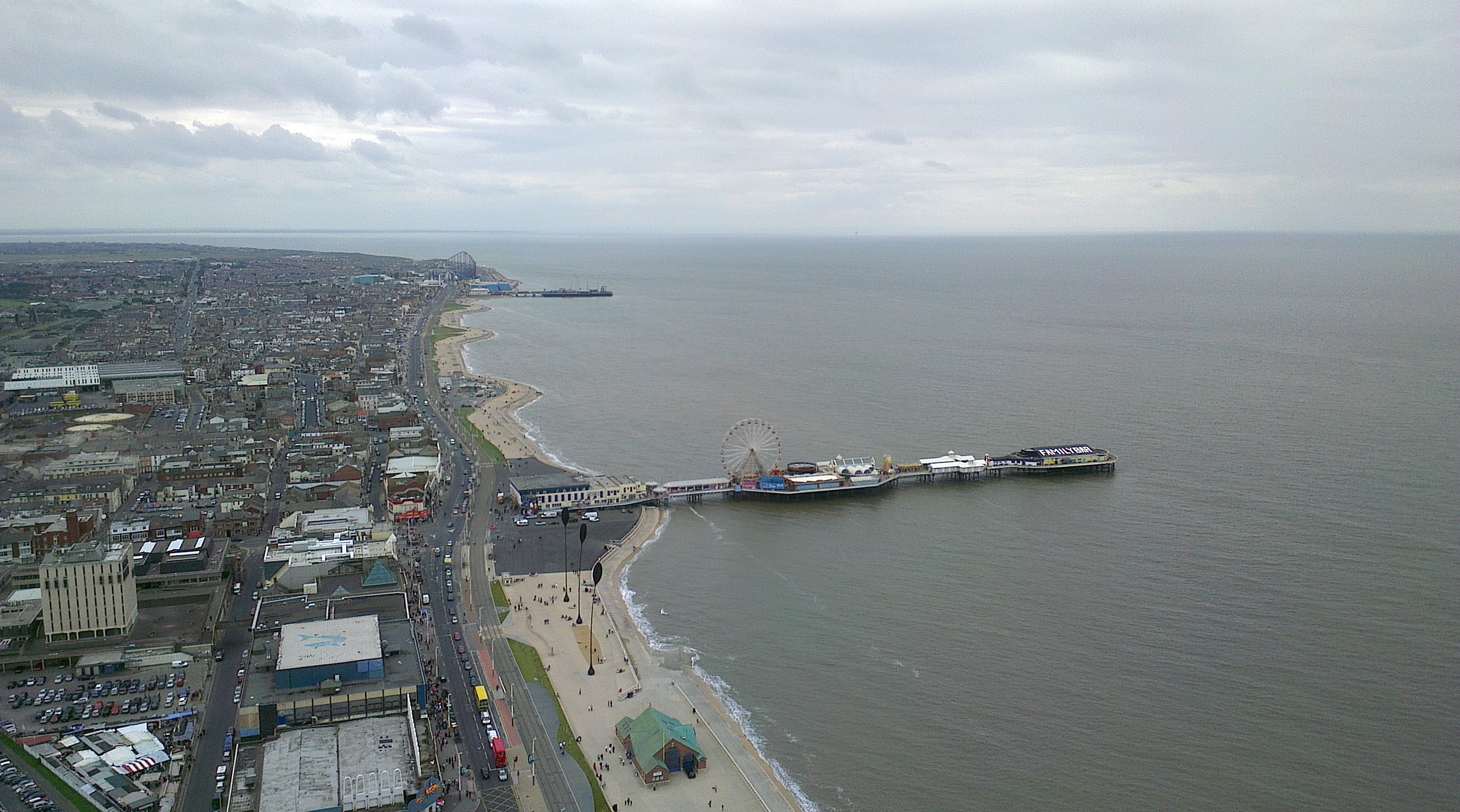
Central Pier, Blackpool (Feb. 2006) (South Pier is in distance)

The pier is central in that it is located between the other two, but it was close to the site of the now-defunct Blackpool Central railway station about 550 yards south of Blackpool Tower. Since the coastline is very straight and flat, the pier simply extends at right angles to the sea front, roughly level with Blackpool Promenade.

== History ==
The success of the North Pier prompted the formation of the Blackpool South Jetty Company one year later in 1864. Authorisation to build a pier was obtained in the South Blackpool Jetty Order 1866 confirmed by the Pier and Harbour Orders Confirmation Act 1866 (29 & 30 Vict. c. 58). Impressed with the construction of Blackpool Pier (North Pier), the company hired the same contractor, Richard Laidlaw and Son of Glasgow for the project. This time, however, the company used the designs of Lieutenant-Colonel John Isaac Mawson rather than those of Eugenius Birch. When the pier was opened on 30 May 1868, it was 503 yards in length, 131 yards of which was a landing jetty for use at low tide. The first manager of the pier was Robert Bickerstaffe, coxswain of the first Blackpool lifeboat. Blackpool's lifeboat station is located next to Central Pier.

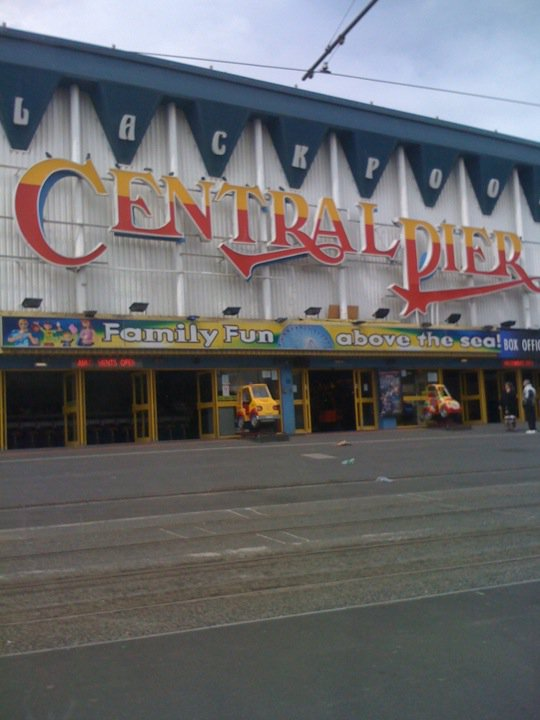
The facade of the pier in July 2011.

From the start, the new pier's emphasis was on fun rather than the genteel relaxation provided at North Pier. In the early days fun was provided mainly by dancing facilities, but in the 20th century, roller skating was introduced along with fairground rides and amusement machines. Steamboat excursions departed from the landing jetty as they did from North Pier. The dance halls became less popular after the Second World War and the facilities were adapted into a theatre, bars and amusement arcades by the 1970s.

The pierhead theatre was modernised in 1986 and became known as "Peggy Sue's Showboat". A striking addition came in 1990 when a 33-metre-high (108 ft) Ferris wheel was erected, a half-scale reference to the Victorian attraction that had been part of the Winter Gardens complex a century earlier.

At around 3:00 a.m. on 17 July 2020, just a week after the pier reopened from the first COVID-19 lockdown, a fire broke out and destroyed a fairground ride.

== Construction and adaptation ==
Central Pier is constructed mostly of cast iron with wooden decking. The piles on which the structure rests were driven using the screw pile method pioneered by Eugenius Birch. This involved twisting screw-tipped cast iron piles down through the sand until they hit bedrock. The materials and building techniques were similar to those used for North Pier but the structure of Central is a little more delicate in appearance.

The pier has suffered relatively little damage save for fires in 1964 and 1973 which gutted the theatre buildings. The main structural alterations have been the removal of the obsolete 131 yards (120 m) low tide jetty in 1975 and the construction of the Ferris wheel in 1990. The addition of the wheel required the midsection of the pier to be strengthened to cope with the extra weight. The Central Pier caught fire in July 2020, destroying a fairground ride and damaging an engineering shed halfway along the pier.

== Attractions ==
- Pirate's Bay Family Bar
- Blackpool Big Wheel
- Peter Sedgewicks Funfair
- Central Pier Family Entertainment Centre
- Old Tyme Portrait Studio

== See also ==
- North Pier, Blackpool
- South Pier, Blackpool
- List of piers in the United Kingdom
