= South Pier, Blackpool =

Pier in Blackpool, England

South Pier
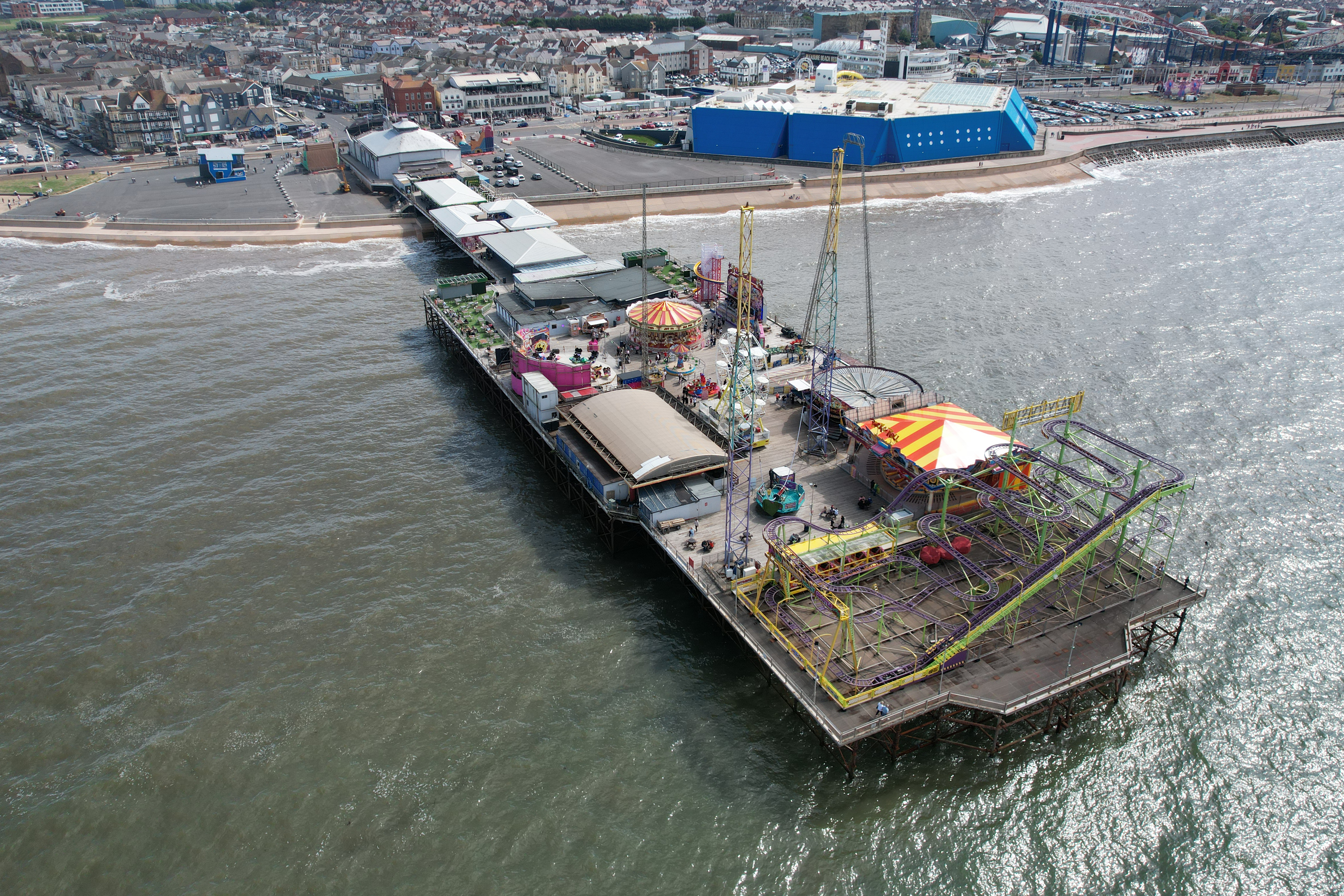
- South Pier as of August 2026
- Type: Pleasure Pier
- Spans: Irish Sea
- Location: South Shore, Blackpool
- Coordinates: 53.7955°N 3.0593°W
- Official name: South Pier
- Owner: Peter Sedgwick

Characteristics
- Total length: 163 yards (149 m)

History
- Designer: T P Worthington
- Opening date: 31 March 1893; 133 years ago
- Location in Blackpool

South Pier (originally known as Victoria Pier) is one of three piers in Blackpool, England. Located on South Promenade on the South Shore, the pier contains a number of amusement and adrenaline rides. It opens each year from March to November and is owned by The Sedgwick family.

== Construction and opening ==
The Blackpool South Shore Pier & Pavilion Co. Ltd. was registered in November 1890 and work began to build the pier in 1892. It was constructed, at a total cost of £50,000, using a different method than that used for North and Central piers, the Worthington Screwpile System, by the company owned by Alderman James Heyes, a twice major of Blackpool. It opened, with a choir, two brass bands and an orchestra on Good Friday 1893. The 3,000 capacity Grand Pavilion opened on 20 May. At 163 yards (149 m) long, it was the shortest of the three piers, and had 36 shops, a bandstand, an ice-cream vendor and a photograph stall. It was built shorter and wider than North and Central piers to accommodate pavilions.

== History ==
Victoria Pier was considered to be more "upmarket" than North and Central piers, and at first provided little entertainment. Holidaymakers started visiting the South Shore in 1896 when a carousel was installed on the sand dunes. In 1902 the south entrance of Blackpool Promenade was widened with the construction of the present promenade, and the pier entrance had to be moved back. In 1930 the pier was renamed South Pier. In 1938 the entrance was widened, and the Regal Pavilion constructed.

Two fires in six years changed the pier dramatically. First in 1958, a fire damaged the Grand Pavilion, followed by a further fire in 1964 which completely destroyed it. It was replaced with a theatre. In 1963 the Regal Theatre, at the entrance, was converted into the Beachcomber Amusement Arcade.

== Modern day pier ==
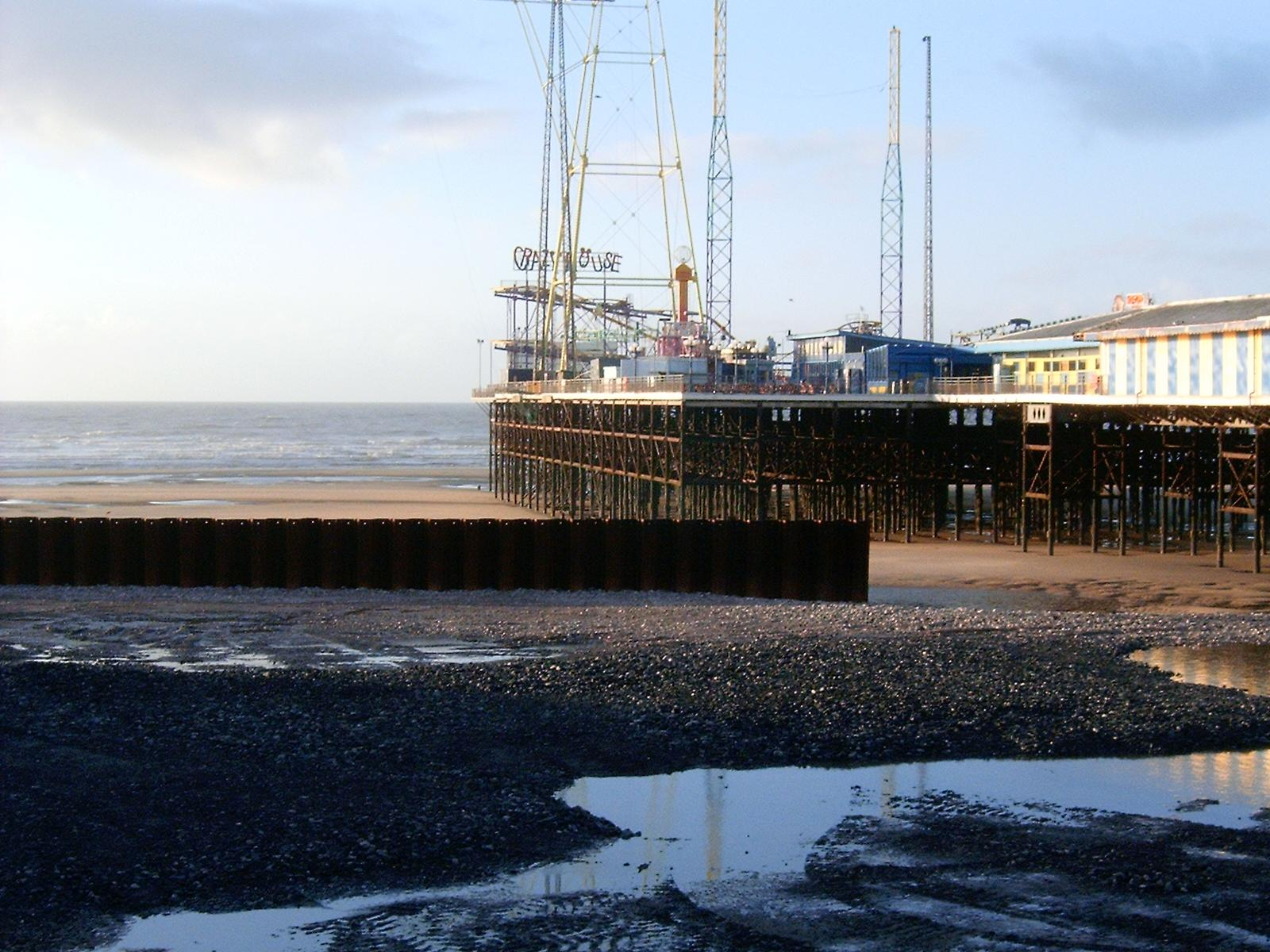
A view of the rides on South Pier

The pier head theatre was demolished and replaced by the Crazy Mouse roller coaster in 1998. The pier now contains numerous rides including dodgems, Crazy Mouse and a Waltzer, the Laughing Donkey Family Bar, which has live entertainment, a Kiddies Ride Arena, as well as the Adrenaline Zone which houses: "Skycoaster", a freefalling swing at a height of 38 m (124 ft 8 in); "Skyscreamer", a Reverse Bungee ride; "Spider Mountain", a multi-storey climbing spiders web; and "Maxibounce", an acrobatic, safety harnessed trampoline.

On 10 April 2011, seventy people were trapped by the tide near the pier.

== See also ==
- Blackpool's North Pier
- Blackpool's Central Pier
- List of piers in the United Kingdom
