= Showtown Blackpool =

Entertainment museum in Blackpool, England (established 2024)

Showtown
- Logo since 2024

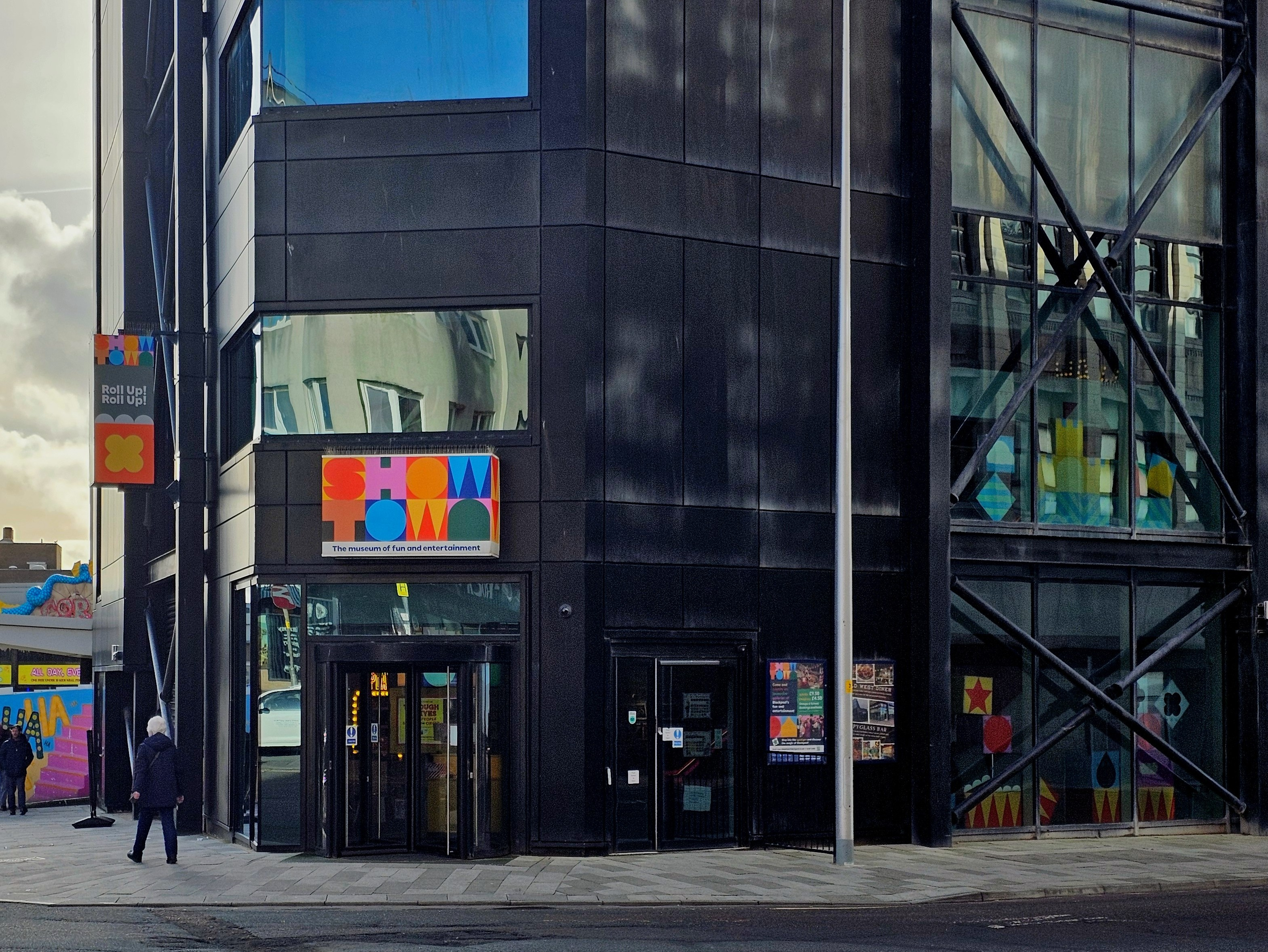
- Showtown's entrance pictured in 2026.

- Location within Blackpool Location within England
- Established: 15 March 2024
- Location: Blackpool, Lancashire, England
- Coordinates: 53.815129°N 3.0547772°W
- Collection size: 800 items (on display)
- Chairperson: Spencer Phillips (chair of trustees)
- Architect: Casson Mann (interior design)
- Owners: Blackpool Heritage and Museums (day-to-day operation); Blackpool Tourism Ltd
- Website: www.showtownblackpool.co.uk

Showtown (sometimes referred to as Showtown Blackpool or the Showtown Museum) is a museum in Blackpool, a resort town in Lancashire, England. It is focused on Blackpool's history as an entertainment town, and includes galleries dedicated to circus, magic, dancing and the Illuminations.

It is joint operated by Blackpool Heritage and Museums and Blackpool Tourism Ltd, both of which are owned by Blackpool Council, and it was opened in March 2024. It is located on Bank Hey Street, near Blackpool Tower.

== History ==
=== Cancelled previous Blackpool museum plan ===
The idea of opening a museum dedicated to Blackpool was first motioned by Blackpool Council leader Simon Blackburn in 2013. The feasibility of opening a museum began to be officially explored by the council in 2014, when they received £1.24m from the Heritage Lottery Fund as well as invested £1m into research.

The original plan for the museum was announced in March 2017 as the "Museum of Blackpool", which was to be located at the Winter Gardens. It was to cost £26 million and would see the Pavillion Theatre and Horseshoe modified into the attraction. The Museum of Blackpool would have had 800 exhibited objects, and would have had areas for both semi-permanent galleries as well as a space for exhibitions. The attraction would have also utilised character actors, who would have wandered around and taught guests circus tricks and magic. To modify the building for the attraction, a new entrance would have been built in Adelaide Street and would have required the demolition of adjacent storage buildings. Blackpool Council applied for £15m from Heritage Lottery Fund to fund the attraction, with £8m intended to be found via donations and other grants.

The Museum of Blackpool plan was cancelled in July 2017 due to the £8m funding gap as well as the plans being deemed financially high risk. Council leader Simon Blackburn stated he believed the museum could be built elsewhere.

=== Showtown ===
The second set of plans for a Blackpool museum were released in November 2017, with a smaller museum called Amuseum. This would be located in the Sands Venue Resort Hotel, an under-construction 5-star hotel - and was intended to cost £10.4m. It was intended to open in June 2020. Like the Museum of Blackpool, 800 objects were announced to be on exhibition.

The museum was announced as being renamed to Showtown in June 2019. The name was inspired by Sir Ken Dodd, who referred to Blackpool affectionately as "Showtown". A launch event was held at the Blackpool Tower Circus on 9 January 2020, and it included a speech from Laurence Llewelyn-Bowen, who was chairman of the Blackpool Museum Trust and Illuminations ambassador. Showtown would cost £13 million, with funding coming from the National Lottery as well as the Northern Cultural Regeneration Fund, Coastal Communities Fund and the Lancashire Growth Deal.

Showtown was labelled as Blackpool's first permanent museum. It was described by the council as the "Jewel in the Crown" of their regeneration scheme plans for the town. Entry would be provided for free to Blackpool residents, and the museum was described as being "highly interactive", with a mix of artefacts and games. The attraction was described by its lead designer Gary Shelley (of the firm Casson Mann) as being "a museum for people who don't go to museums".

Showtown was originally intended to open in 2021, but the COVID-19 pandemic as well as delays with the construction of the Sands Venue Resort Hotel led to the museum's construction only beginning in September 2021. Showtown's opening was consequently delayed to 2024.

Showtown opened to the public on 15 March 2024. The attraction was officially opened by Alfie Boe, alongside Norman Barrett, Paul Zenon, and Graham Liver of BBC Lancashire.

The V&A Museum, lent 28 items to Showtown for display in the attraction. This includes Tommy Cooper's fez and the Sooty, Sweep and Soo puppets. Showtown further added to its collection when it acquired a significant amount of artifacts relating to famous Blackpool Tower Circus clown Charlie Cairoli in October 2024. This included programmes and letters relating to his career as well as documentation of his performances throughout the UK during World War II.

In February 2025, the museum cut 15% of its jobs, and its original CEO, Elizabeth Moss, left. While Blackpool Heritage and Museums continued day-to-day operation of the attraction, the operational overview of the attraction was handed over to Blackpool Operating Company Ltd (BOCL). A review was made of the ticket pricing structure, although it was noted free entry to Blackpool residents would be retained. BOCL later that year became Blackpool Tourism Ltd - the new operator of the Blackpool Tower - and Showtown was added to their range of attractions. When it launched in November 2025, Showtown was also included in Blackpool Tourism Ltd's annual pass scheme.

On 2 November 2026, the museum launched Showtown Backstage, their digital collections portal, to allow people to access their collections online. The first collections added were that of the clown Charlie Cairoli, the Blackpool Illuminations, and the Blackpool Tower Circus. Further additions to the service are planned for the future, as part of Showtown's Unlocking Collections project.

== Galleries ==
Each of the galleries are named after phrases associated with their respective topic:

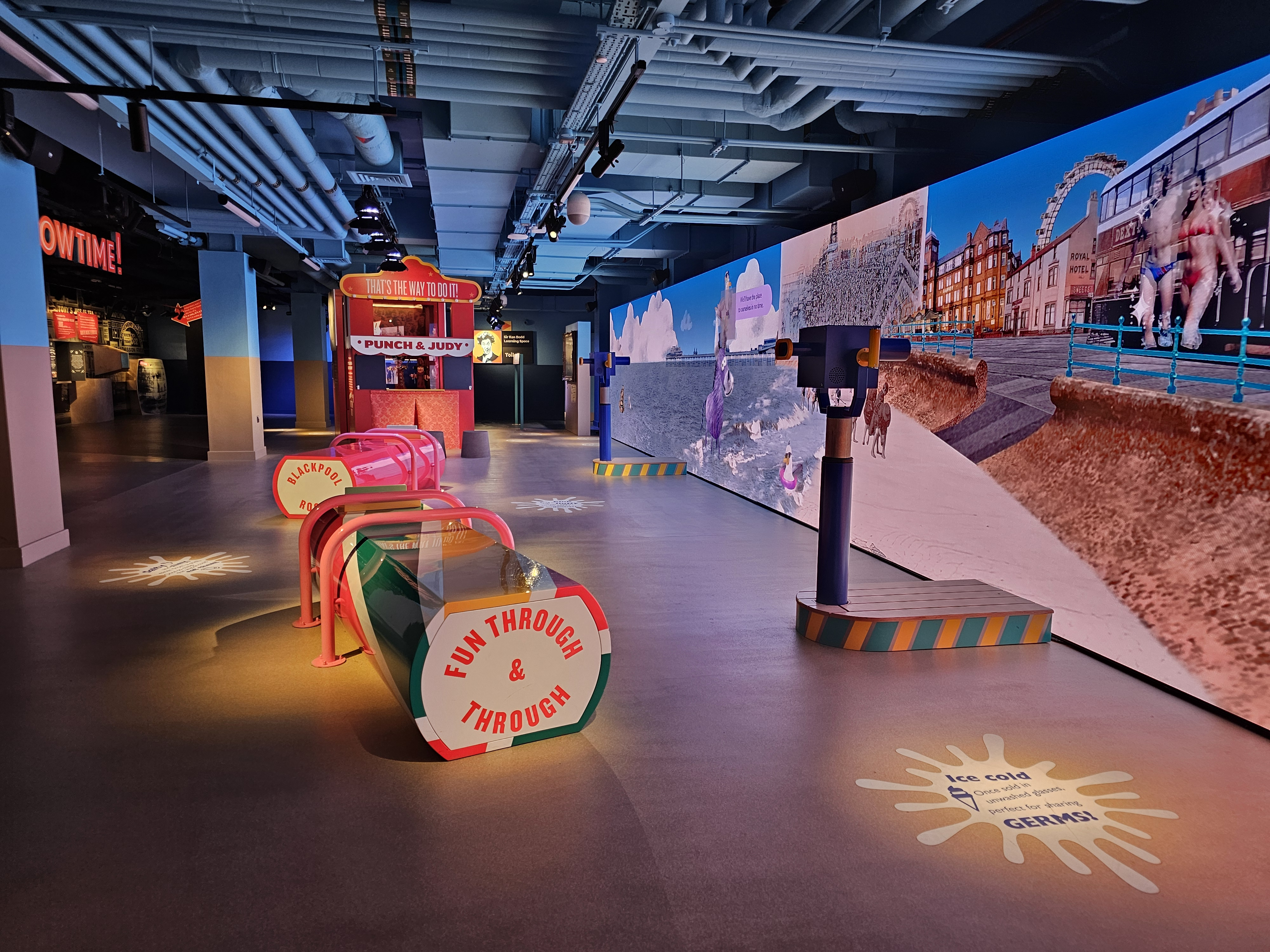
Beside the Seaside

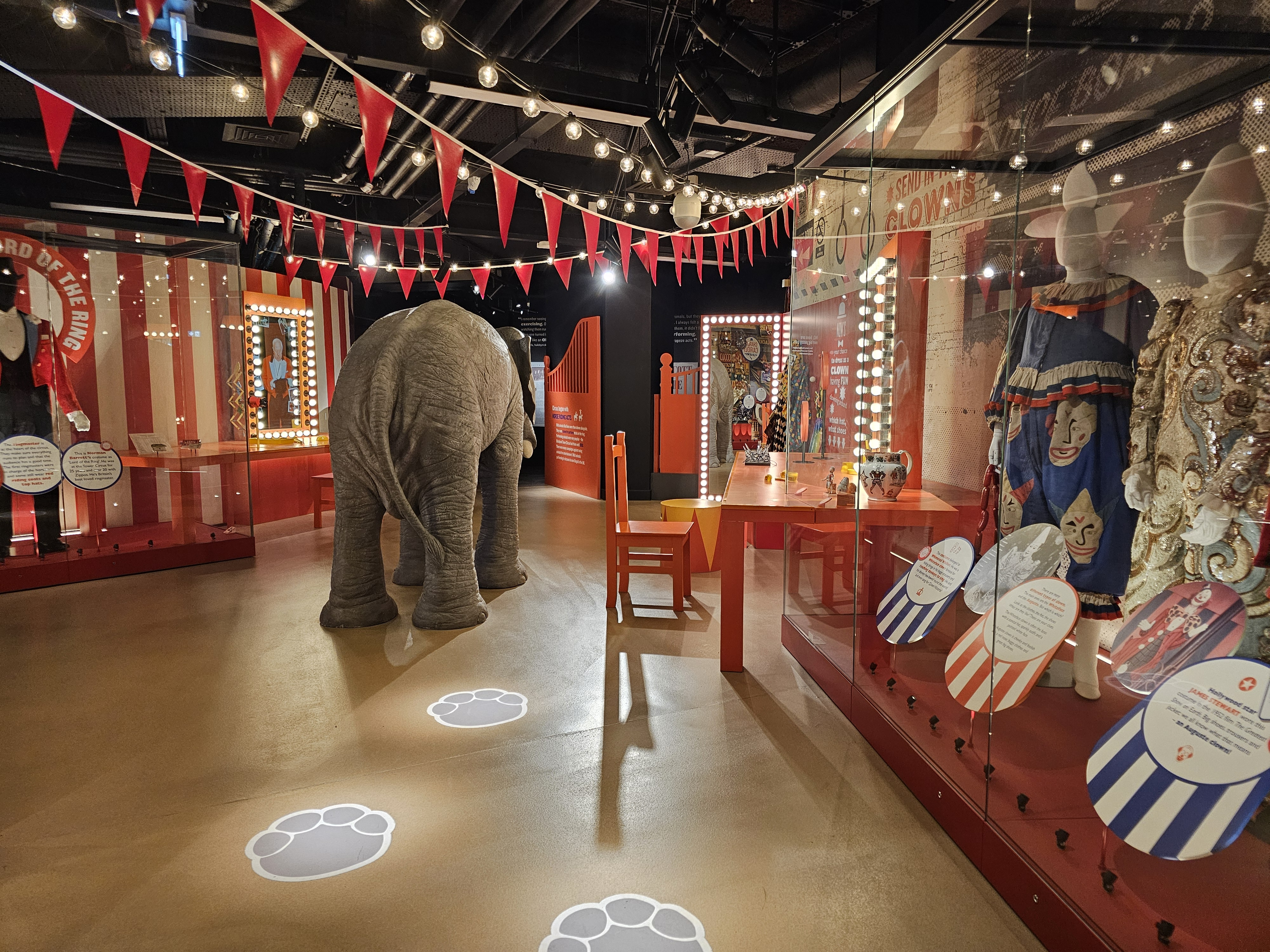
Roll Up! Roll Up!

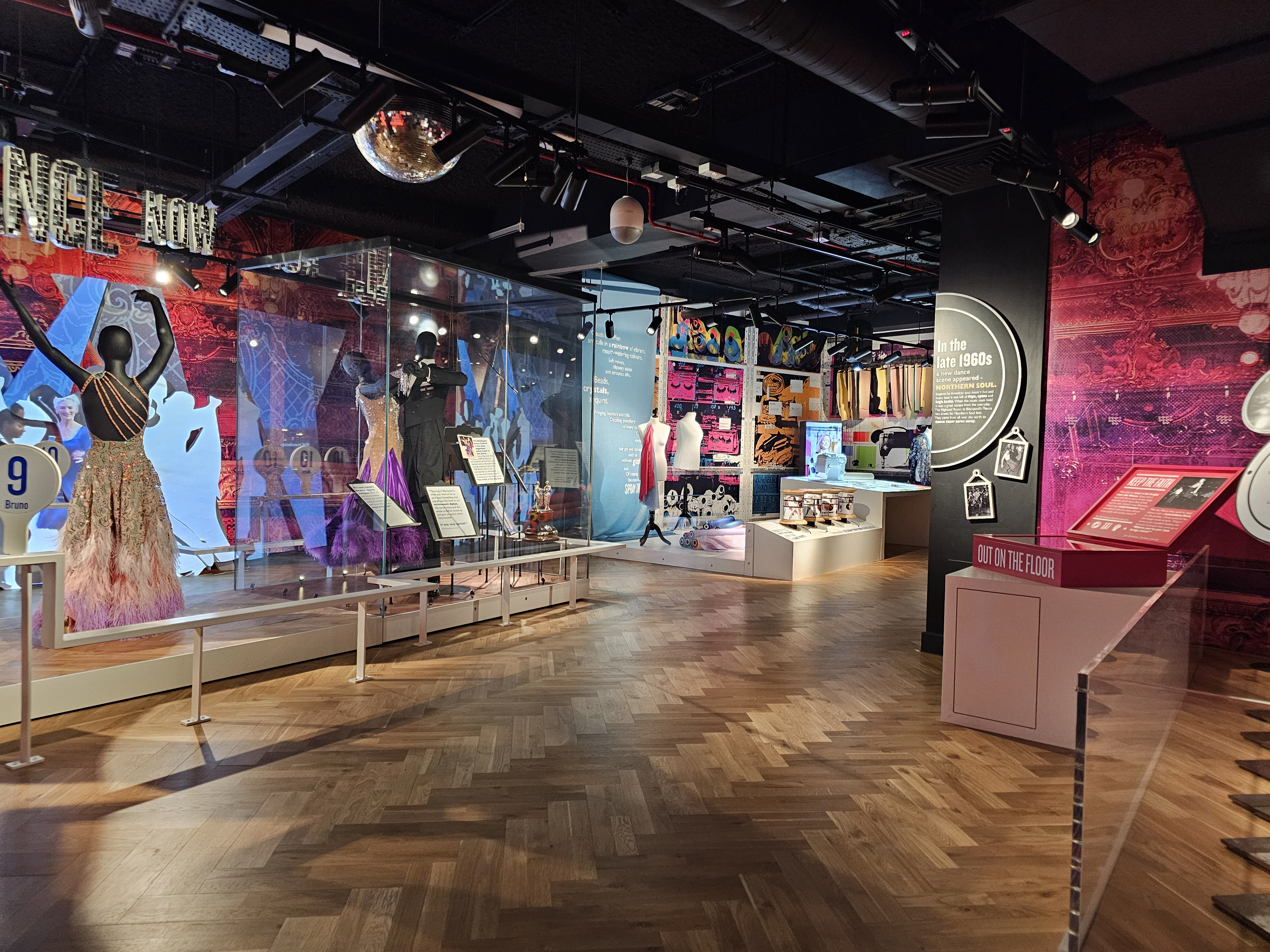
Everybody Dance Now

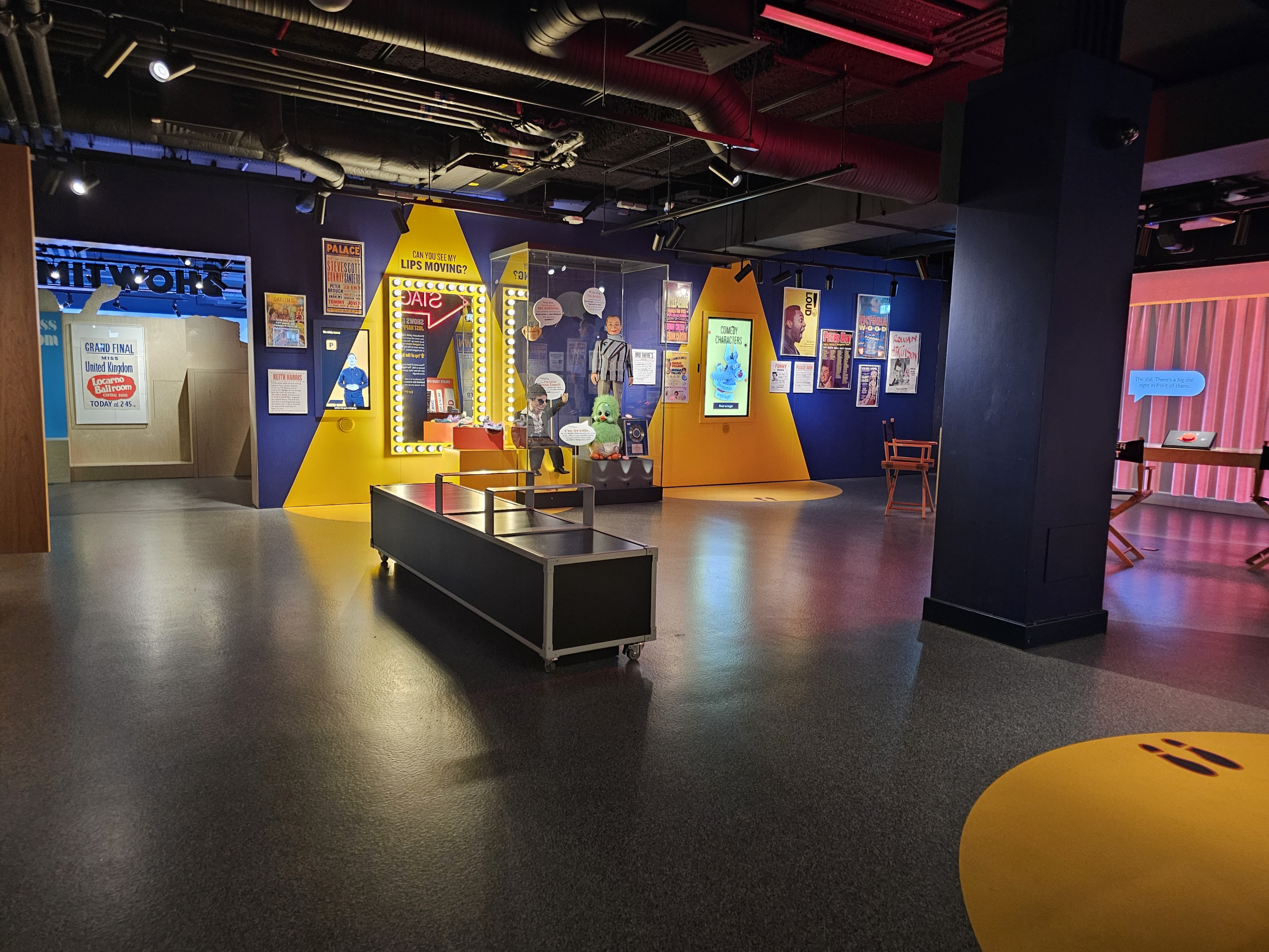
It's Showtime!

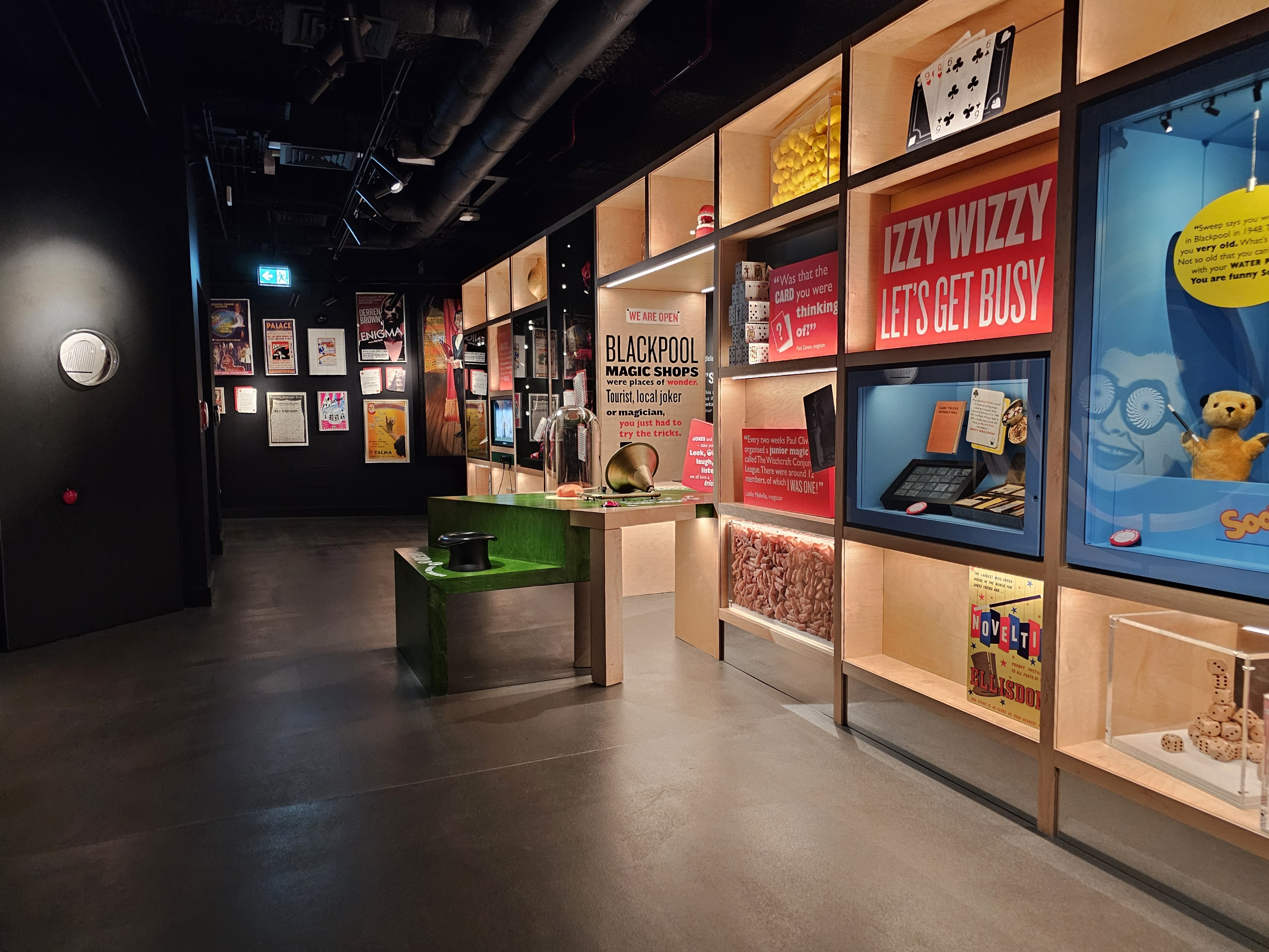
How's Tricks?

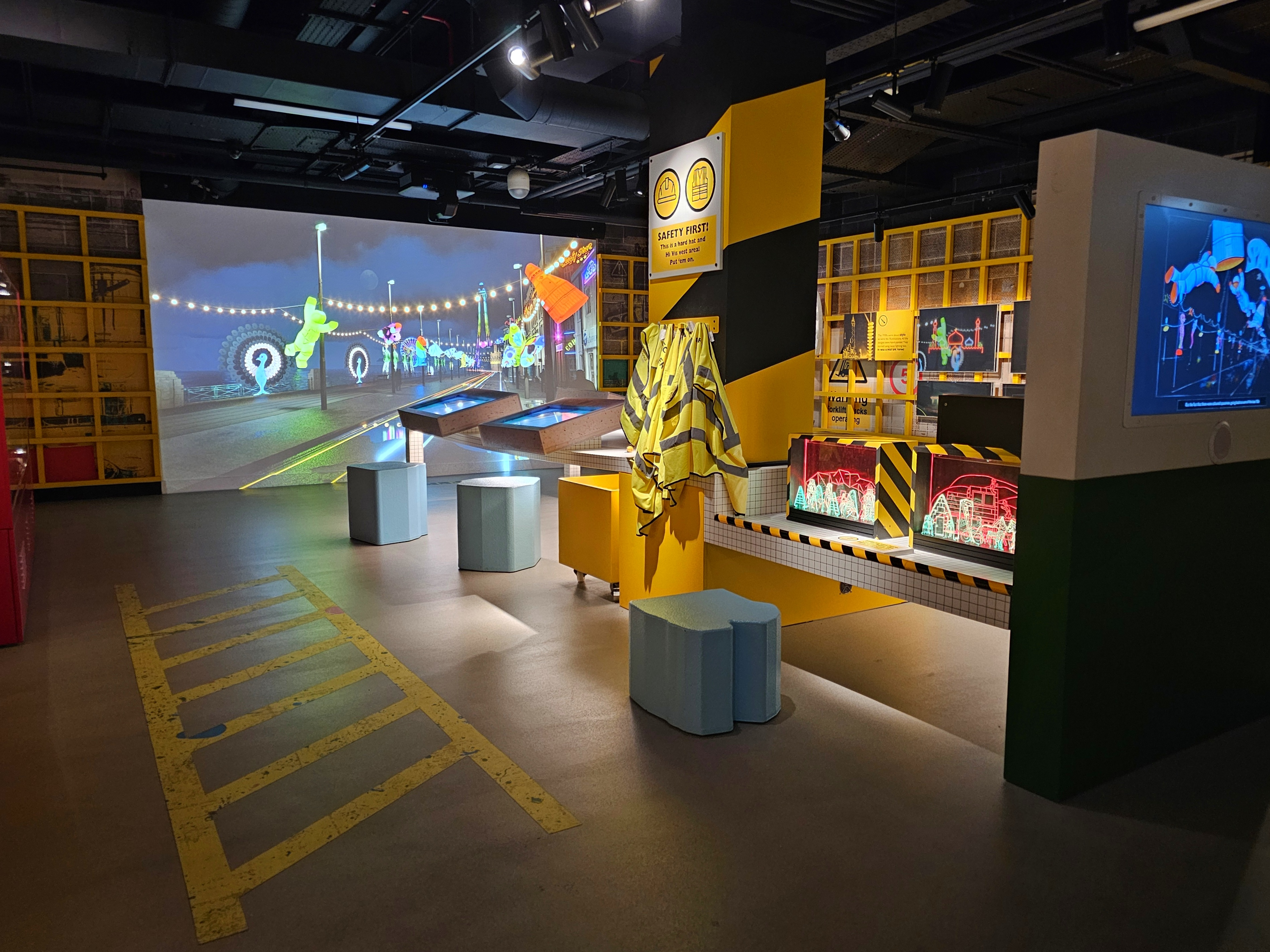
It's Better with the Lights on

=== Beside the Seaside (Blackpool) ===
The first exhibit, which explores the history of Blackpool. This gallery features a large 17-metre video screen and prop donkey. Is often home to the walkaround characters such as Mrs Bickershaw - a 1940s Blackpool landlady; and a 1950s walkies photographer.

A small display chronicles the history of Punch and Judy, and includes both display puppets and interactive puppets to try on. There is also a photobooth where guests can add their faces to the people on the large digital display in the gallery.

=== Roll Up! Roll Up! (Circus) ===
The Roll Up! Roll Up! gallery is dedicated to circus, especially that of the town's most famous circus: Blackpool Tower Circus. Mirrors feature numerous circus figures - namely Norman Barrett, Mooky the Clown and Mr Boo, and Laura Jayne Miller - explaining the history of ringmasters, clowns and aerial performers respectively. Display items include Norman Barrett's ringmaster outfit, Charlie Cairoli's props and Doodles' clown shoes.

A ringmaster walkaround character can be frequently seen in the gallery teaching circus tricks.

=== Everybody Dance Now (Dance) ===
Dedicated to Blackpool's dance culture. Everybody Dance Now features sections on the Palace Nightclub, Northern soul and includes what was the DJ stage from the defunct Mecca club in the Town. Parts of the gallery are dedicated to Strictly Come Dancing and its connection to Blackpool, particularly the Tower Ballroom. Contains dresses as worn by dancers in the show, and a display features an interview with Vicky Gill, a designer of costumes for the show.

There is also a projection screen which allows patrons to place their heads inside holes to make it look like they are the ones dancing on the screen.

=== It's Showtime! (Shows) ===
A gallery dedicated to the variety and comedy shows which have been staged in Blackpool as well as the performers who were in them. Features a section which holds entertainer's costumes such as Peter Kay's Amarillo suit, and two suits worn by Morecambe and Wise. A small section is dedicated to ventriloquism, and includes one of the Orville the Duck puppets. There is also a small display about Funny Girls, which utilises a Pepper's Ghost effect.

There is also a multi person game where players must judge variety acts to put in a variety show.

=== How's Tricks? (Magic) ===
How's Tricks is dedicated to magic and the acts that have performed in the town. It includes posters from famous magic shows from Blackpool's past, as well as a small display on The Sooty Show including puppets of Sooty, Sweep and Soo. Other exhibits include a police cell Harry Houdini escaped from in 1905.

=== It's Better with the Lights on (The Blackpool Illuminations) ===
A gallery dedicated to the Blackpool Illuminations, the town's famous light festival. Includes an interactive display where you can design your own Blackpool Illuminations lighting, as well as a light-up mirrors room with a button. Objects on display include a letter from office of Walt Disney thanking for the use of Disney characters in Illuminations displays as a form of advertisement.

=== Other spaces ===
==== The Sir Ken Dodd Learning Space ====
An event room for talks and classes. Named after the comedian Sir Ken Dodd. his widow, Anne donated to the museum to help create this space.

==== Exhibition Space ====
The exhibition space is where the Museum's exhibitions are located.

==== Showtown History Centre ====
Located in Blackpool Central Library, Showtown History Centre is where Blackpool's archives in local history and heritage are kept and where they are able to be viewed by the public. Originally called the Local and Family History Centre, it became known as the History Centre in 2017 - then to connect it to the upcoming museum, it became the Showtown History Centre in October 2022. From 2020 until 2025, the centre was closed due to a leak in the roof of the library. Collections were kept elsewhere and were unable to be accessed whilst repairs took place. It reopened to the public in April 2025.

== Exhibitions ==
Since opening, Showtown has hosted the following exhibitions:

Name	Dates	Topic
Showtown Celebration Exhibition	15 March - 7 June 2024	About the creation of Showtown.
Andy Hollingworth 'I Photograph Comedians'	13 July 2024 - 23 February 2025	A collection of photographs of famous comedians as taken by Andy Hollingworth.
Wartime Blackpool	2 April - 9 November 2025	A collection focused on Blackpool during World War II.
Through Our Eyes: Little People Beyond the Circus	12 February - 31 May 2026	About little people and their history within Blackpool and its entertainment culture.
Happiness! The Ken Dodd Exhibition	24 June 2026 - 3 January 2027	About the Liverpudlian comic Sir Ken Dodd. Originally exhibited at Museum of Liverpool.

== Awards and reception ==
Showtown won the Permanent Exhibition of the Year award at the Museums + Heritage Awards 2025. It was also a finalist in the international Children in Museums Award.

Showtown was also featured in The Guardian in their best design and architecture of 2025 list. It was chosen by fashion historian and curator Amber Butchart, who was particularly complimentary of the Gérard Vicaire-designed clown costumes on display in the Circus gallery.

In September 2026, Showtown's exhibition Through Our Eyes: Little People Beyond the Circus was nominated for the Inclusive Spaces Award, by the Museums Association's Museums Change Lives Awards. The exhibition was praised for its examination of Blackpool's past involving little people in entertainment spaces, with the exhibition developed alongside a team of little people and people with lived experience with dwarfism. The exhibition was displayed at a lower height to be adapted for viewing by little people, including lowering the displays, adjusting the lighting to avoid glare and supplying steps for those who needed them to see displays. This exhibition was then adapted into a toolkit made by participants to provide other museums and archives with advice on how to approach items and exhibits featuring little people.
