= Mooky the Clown =

British clown (born 1974)

Laci Endresz Jr. BEM
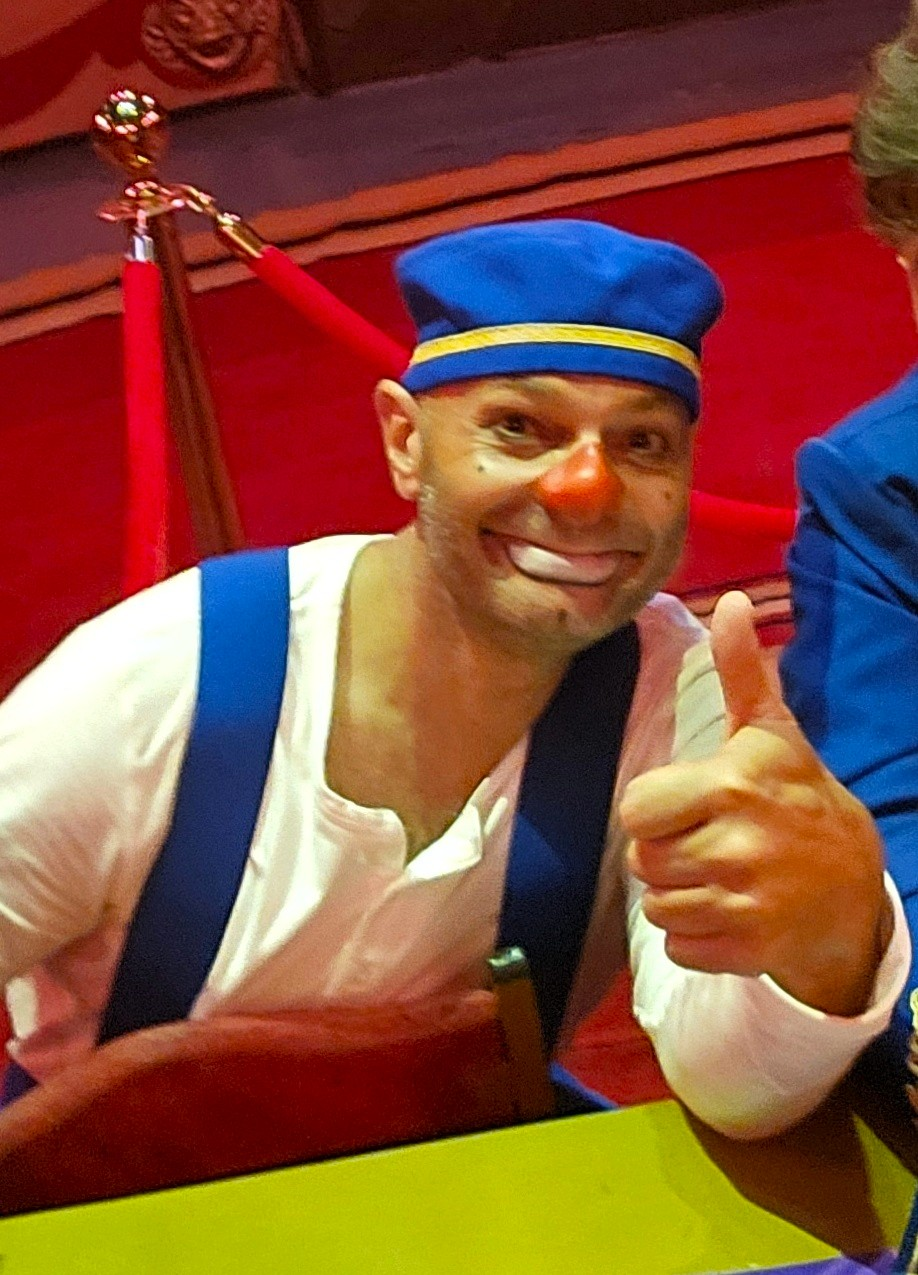
- Endresz as Mooky in 2025.
- Born: Laszlo Robert Fossett Endresz; 28 July 1974 (age 52); Eastbourne, East Sussex, England
- Other name: Mooky the Clown

Comedy career
- Medium: Circus
- Genre: Circus clown

Laszlo Robert Fossett "Laci" Endresz Jr. BEM (Note: Pronounced English: /ˈlɒtsiː ˈɛndrɛz/ LOT-see END-rez There is an alternate spelling and pronunciation of Endresz sometimes used by him and his family - Endrész, pronounced /ˈɛndreɪz/ END-rayz) (born 28 July 1974) is an English circus performer and producer who performs as the circus clown Mooky the Clown. He has been the main clown at the Blackpool Tower Circus since 1999.

Beginning his circus career in childhood working primarily as a juggler, Endresz gradually transitioned to clowning in the late 1990s through his family's management of the Blackpool Tower Circus from 1992 onwards. In the years since, his multi-decade long run as resident clown at the Tower Circus has been compared to other famous Tower Circus clowns Doodles and Charlie Cairoli, and he has become a well-known figure within Blackpool and its tourism culture.

== Background ==
Endresz was born in Eastbourne, East Sussex, England. His father, Laci Endresz Sr., was born in Hungary and was from 1992 until 2025 the director of the Blackpool Tower Circus at Blackpool Tower.

He is from a circus family: seven generations of his family have performed in the circus on his father's side and nine generations on his mother's side.

== Career ==
=== Early career (1978 – 1992) ===
Endresz first appeared as a clown in his family's musical clown act on his fourth birthday. He appeared at the end of the routine - where he played on a trombone. He said from this moment on, upon making the audience laugh, he was "hooked" and knew he wanted to work in the circus.

Prior to 1999, he was usually known as "Mini Mooky" when performing as a clown, as his father was known as Mooky the Clown at the time. In total, Endresz is the third member of his family to have adopted the name Mooky for his clown character. The name was first used by his grandfather in Hungary during the 1940s and was then adopted by his father from the 1970s until the late 1990s.

As a child, he performed in circuses as a juggler and in a springboard act with his family. He performed at the Belle Vue Zoological Gardens and at the SECC in Glasgow, during the festive seasons of 1982/83 and 1988/89 respectively. Other circuses he and his family performed at during this time include Cirkus Benneweis, Circus Mundial, Cirkus Merano, and Sirkus Finlandia - the latter two circuses for three seasons each.

In 1985, Endresz won a medal for his juggling act at the Cirque Mondial de Demain Festival in Paris, France. Then in 1987, at the age of 12, he performed at the 12th International Circus Festival of Monte-Carlo with his sister Kate – juggling with nunchucks, five and seven rings, four and five clubs, three then five balls and finishing his act with five fire torches. During this time, he also appeared on and performed on television. He performed on The Paul Daniels Magic Show twice - in the 1983 Christmas special and on a Series 12 episode in 1991. He also performed his act at the Royal Command Performance.

In 1991, his father was awarded the contract to operate the Blackpool Tower Circus by owners First Leisure from the 1992 season onwards. Over the 1991/92 festive season - prior to coming to Blackpool - he performed his juggling act and in his family's musical clown act at Wembley as part of the show Jeremy Beadle in Gerry Cottle's Circus.

=== At the Blackpool Tower Circus (1992 – present) ===
==== Initial work at the Tower Circus and touring abroad (1992 – 1997) ====
At the Tower Circus, Endresz initially performed as a juggler or in comedy acts. As well as continuing to perform comedy as Mini Mooky - Endresz was part of the Lloyds; a comedy acrobatics troupe which he performed in with his sister Kate Endresz and Andras Banlaki. They performed together as the Lloyds in the 1992 and 1994 Tower Circus main seasons.At the same time, the three also created and performed the juggling act "Wild on Wheels" - where Endresz juggled on the back of a moving motorcycle driven by Banlaki, while his sister aided him in juggling. This was first performed in the 1994 Tower Circus main show

After the 1994 Tower Circus main show, Endresz took the "Wild on Wheels" act to various other circuses. One was Cirkus Merano in Norway for the 1995 season, and another was Bobby Robert's Super Circus at the SECC in Glasgow during the festive season of 1995/96. At the SECC show, he also performed as Mooky as part of a troupe of clowns who did a water comedy routine. “Wild on Wheels” won Endresz a second silver medal at the Cirque Mondial de Demain Festival in 1995.

==== Return to the Tower Circus and career as Mooky the Clown (1997 – present) ====
After touring with “Wild on Wheels”, Endresz returned to the Tower Circus at the end of 1997 for the first circus pantomime Aladdin Goes to the Circus. Here, Endresz was asked to stay for the upcoming summer season, but due to the presence of another juggler in the show, he instead worked again as Mini Mooky. Endresz said later on that he used this season to develop his clown character further.

After performing a routine as Mooky in the 1998 Circus pantomime Cinderella’s Adventures at the Circus - for the 1999 main show, Endresz took over as the main Mooky the Clown, and in the process became the primary clown at the Blackpool Tower Circus. It was at this point he introduced his current look for Mooky: during the 1999 show Mooky acted as a "ringboy" who would interrupt the circus acts. The ringboy's uniform at the Tower Circus during this time was blue and gold with a matching skullcap. Endresz would adopt this as Mooky's look, and has continued to wear it throughout his career even after Mooky's role as ringboy was dropped. The 1999 season also featured Endresz, out of clown makeup, performing "Wild on Wheels" - the last time he would perform the act as the main juggler. He would however later on, as Mooky, be the accompanying juggler for his brother Bubu when he performed the same act in the Tower Circus in 2007 and 2011.

Since then, he has starred, without break, each year in the summer circus show as Mooky the Clown; and until it was discontinued in 2020, in the Circus’ pantomime as well. He was similarly prominently featured in the Showzam! festival circuses - which ran for a fortnight in February from 2008 until 2012.

As Mooky the Clown, he won the Circus Friend Association’s “Best Comedy act in Great Britain Award” four times: from 2000 - 2002, and again in 2004. He was also awarded Blackpool tourist attraction operator Leisure Parcs’ “Entertainer of the Year” award twice - in 1999 and in 2002.

Endresz as Mooky has also become a prominent cultural figure within Blackpool. Tourists to the resort often come to the Tower Circus with the intention of seeing him perform in the same way they did for previous Tower Circus resident clowns. As well as appearing extensively in publicity both for The Blackpool Tower and the resort of Blackpool as a whole from the 2000s onwards, he has also made appearances as Mooky at other events both within the town and the wider Fylde Coast. In February 2010, as part of the Showzam! circus and magic festival - a workshop to cure coulrophobia included Endresz meeting the participants out of character and then gradually getting into character as Mooky to provide a form of exposure therapy for attendees.

As well as his role as Mooky, Endresz is also known to be responsible at the Blackpool Tower Circus for backstage co-ordination; and since at least 2017, stage direction. He also builds the majority of the props used in the circus. In 2025, he, along with Bubu, took over as the main producers of the Blackpool Tower Circus.

=== Other work ===
Endresz appeared in the 1995 film Funny Bones as a juggler. He also appears in the short film Grimaldi: The Funniest Man in the World, playing young Joseph Grimaldi alongside his brother Bubu Endresz, who plays young Jack Bologna. He also performed his juggling act on the Children's Variety Performance in 1994.

In 2007, he appeared in the second series of the Channel 4 documentary The Convention Crasher as Mooky, helping Justin Lee Collins learn clowning before he travelled to the United States to participate in a clowning convention in Houston, Texas.

== Performance style ==
Archetypally for an Auguste clown, Mooky the Clown wears a red nose and makeup on his face. His makeup design consists of a large white muzzle, with black outlines on his mouth, eyes, chin, as well as a dot of black makeup on each cheek. Similarly distinct to his clown appearance is the blue and gold skullcap on his head. This skullcap was introduced in 1999 - previously, he wore a red brimmed hat like his father's incarnation of Mooky.

As a clown, Endresz is more known for performing verbal comedy than visual comedy. He widely uses puns and word-play in his routines alongside many other forms of jokes - however he does still feature some slapstick in his clowning. Much of Mooky’s comedy routines involve him butting heads with a straight man (specifically a White clown), who often tries and fails to control Mooky’s chaotic behaviour in the ring.

Over the years there have been different characters who have played the role of straight man to Mooky:

- Initially, from 1999 to 2001, it was a ringmaster character played by Laci Endresz Sr.
- In 2002, Mr Maxi, an arrogant White clown was introduced in his place. Attila Endresz was the first to play Mr Maxi - doing so until 2007; while Tom Fackrell took over for the 2007 main season.
- Endresz’ brother, Tom "Bubu" Endresz, became Mooky’s latest straight man - Mr Boo (spelt as Mr Booo until 2014), from the February 2008 Showzam! show, Mooky's Circus Carnival onwards. Mr Boo is a similar character to Mr Maxi; and much like his real life counterpart, is Mooky’s brother.

In the Tower Circus, he and Mr Boo typically begin the show with a variant of the "you can't play here" traditional clown routine, in which Mooky regularly interrupts Mr Boo's music performances. This usually results in the main verbal back-and-forth between the two clowns - where Mr Boo attempts to get Mooky to vacate the stage. Mooky is also known for juggling, playing musical instruments, and sometimes comically taking part in flying trapeze acts in the show. From 2009, he has also become noted for speed-painting - a performance art he does on occasion at the Tower Circus. Here, he paints upside down on a black canvas and flips it around to reveal a portrait. In past shows at the Blackpool Tower Circus, he has painted Yoda, Marilyn Monroe, and a self-portrait - among others.

During the 2000s, a mainstay of Mooky’s comedy each year in the Tower Circus was the “Shmitt Brothers” - a duo of incompetent performing brothers who he would portray alongside his straight man at the time. They would typically parody a circus act which performed immediately prior to them, and the routine would follow the brothers disagreeing onstage over the act's direction. In recent years, the only of these routines still regularly performed is the Springboard act parody, and is often performed without satirising a specific act in the show.

== Awards ==
In June 2026, Endresz was awarded a British Empire Medal in the 2026 Birthday Honours for services to circus entertainment in the North West of England. Speaking of the award, he stated:

“This really is so special for me and my family. I love what I do - everything from designing and building the props to producing and directing the show. Over the last three decades, I’ve had the honour of entertaining millions of visitors to The Blackpool Tower Circus. It isn’t a job to me; it is my passion and calling in life. I am humbled to have been chosen to receive a British Empire Medal.”

He has also won a number of other awards as a clown and circus performer, including:

Award	Organization	Location	Year	Notes
Silver Medal Winner	Festival Mondial du Cirque de Demain	Paris, France	1985	Won for his juggling act.
Silver Medal Winner	Festival Mondial du Cirque de Demain	Paris, France	1995	Won for his juggling act "Wild on Wheels".
Best Ground Act in Great Britain	Circus Friends Association		1999	Won for his juggling act "Wild on Wheels".
Leisure Parcs Entertainer of the Year	Leisure Parcs	Blackpool, United Kingdom	1999	
Best Comedy Act in Great Britain	Circus Friends Association		2000	As Mooky
Best Comedy Act in Great Britain	Circus Friends Association		2001	As Mooky
Best Comedy Act in Great Britain	Circus Friends Association		2002	As Mooky
Leisure Parcs Entertainer of the Year	Leisure Parcs	Blackpool, United Kingdom	2002	
Best Comedy Act in Great Britain	Circus Friends Association		2004	As Mooky, joint award with Mr Maxi (Attila Endresz)
Silver Cup	Hansa Theatre	Hamburg, Germany.		
Circus Personality of the Year	Bayern Munich Carnival, Circus Krone	Germany		
Gold medal winner	Tokyo Circus Festival	Tokyo, Japan		
Best All Round Entertainer		Budapest, Hungary		

== Filmography ==
=== Actor ===
==== Film ====
Year	Title	Role	Notes
1994	Funny Bones	Juggler	
2017	Grimaldi: The Funniest Man in the World	Young Joseph Grimaldi	Credited as Mooky
