= Doodles (clown) =

British clown (1877 - 1949)

William McAllister
- Born: William Patrick McAllister c. November 1877; Cowcaddens, Glasgow, Scotland
- Died: 30 October 1949 (aged 71); Potter's Bar, Middlesex, England
- Other name: Doodles

Comedy career
- Medium: Circus
- Genre: Circus clown

William Patrick McAllister (c. November 1877 - 30 October 1949), known professionally as Doodles the Clown, was a British circus clown best known for being resident clown at both the Blackpool Tower Circus for 30 years and at Hengler’s Circus in Glasgow for 20 years.

== Career ==
=== Early career ===
McAllister was born on New City Road in Cowcaddens, Glasgow. His circus career began at Bostock's Circus, located on the same street, when he was 11. Initially, he worked as an acrobat and wire-walker with the troupe Zalva and Alvar, becoming the third member Espana. He spent many years as a gymanst in a circus in Germany.

=== As Doodles ===
McAllister took up clowning whilst in a circus in Scarborough. He soon joined Hengler's Circus on Sauchiehall Street in Glasgow, where he became resident clown. After Hengler's Circus closed, he made appearances at Kelvin Hall.

In 1915, McAllister replaced John Albert Griffiths - September the Clown - at the Tower Circus in Blackpool, after Griffiths died from a short illness. From here until 1926, he would perform with Griffith’s old comedy partner - August (Robert Elliot). Afterwards, he would be joined by various other clowns including Fiery Jack, Austin and the Van Normans. Doodles became popular in Blackpool, and was elected King of the town's carnival twice.

As a clown, Doodles was known for his short stature (4ft 10in) and husky voice. In his act, he would interact with the ringmaster George Lockhart, who during the show would typically "fire" Doodles for his misbehaviour but subsequently reinstate him when the audience would heckle to defend him. Doodles would also famously be rolled up in the circus carpet during the show.

Gradually, he was only seen for short appearances during the show due to ill health. He ceased clowning at the end of the 1944 Blackpool Tower Circus season, and retired to a property in Potter's Bar.

He makes a brief appearance in the 1934 film Sing As We Go during filmed scenes of a Blackpool Tower Circus show.

== Death and legacy ==
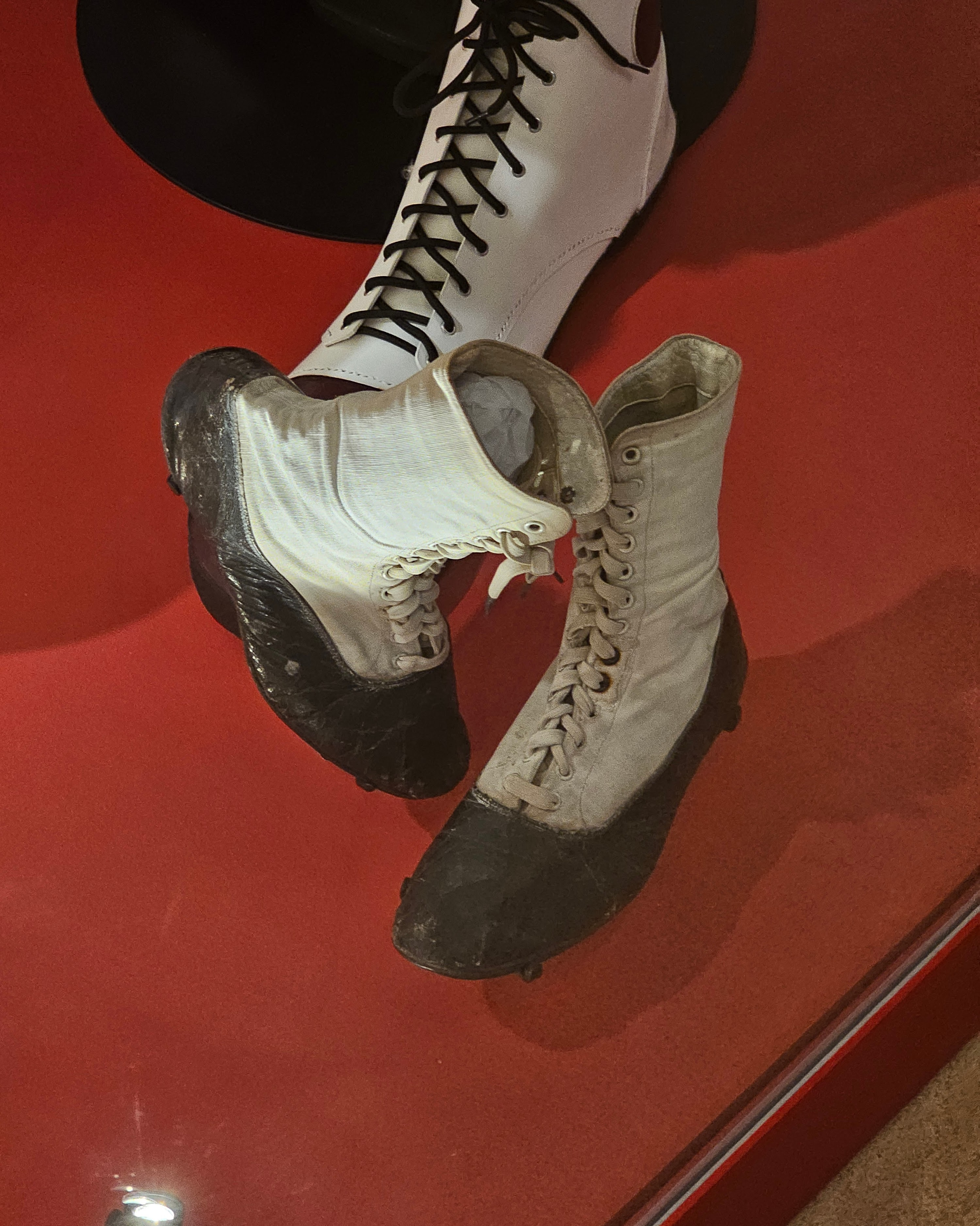
Doodles' clown shoes (front) on display at Showtown in Blackpool in 2025

McAllister died on 30 October 1949 at his home in Potter’s Bar. As per his wishes upon death, his ashes are buried in Church of St Stephen on-the-Cliffs in Blackpool.

In Blackpool, McAllister is considered as being one of the first prolific Tower Circus resident clowns, a role in which he was later followed in by clowns such as Charlie Cairoli and Mooky the Clown.

Captain Tom Moore's father was a fan of Doodles, and recalls him and childhood visits to the Blackpool Tower Circus in his book ‘Tomorrow Will Be a Good Day’.

His clown shoes have been on display in Blackpool's Showtown Museum since 2024.
