= Blackpool Tower Circus =

Long-running British circus show (established 1894)

Coordinates: 53.815922°N 3.055225°W

The Blackpool Tower Circus
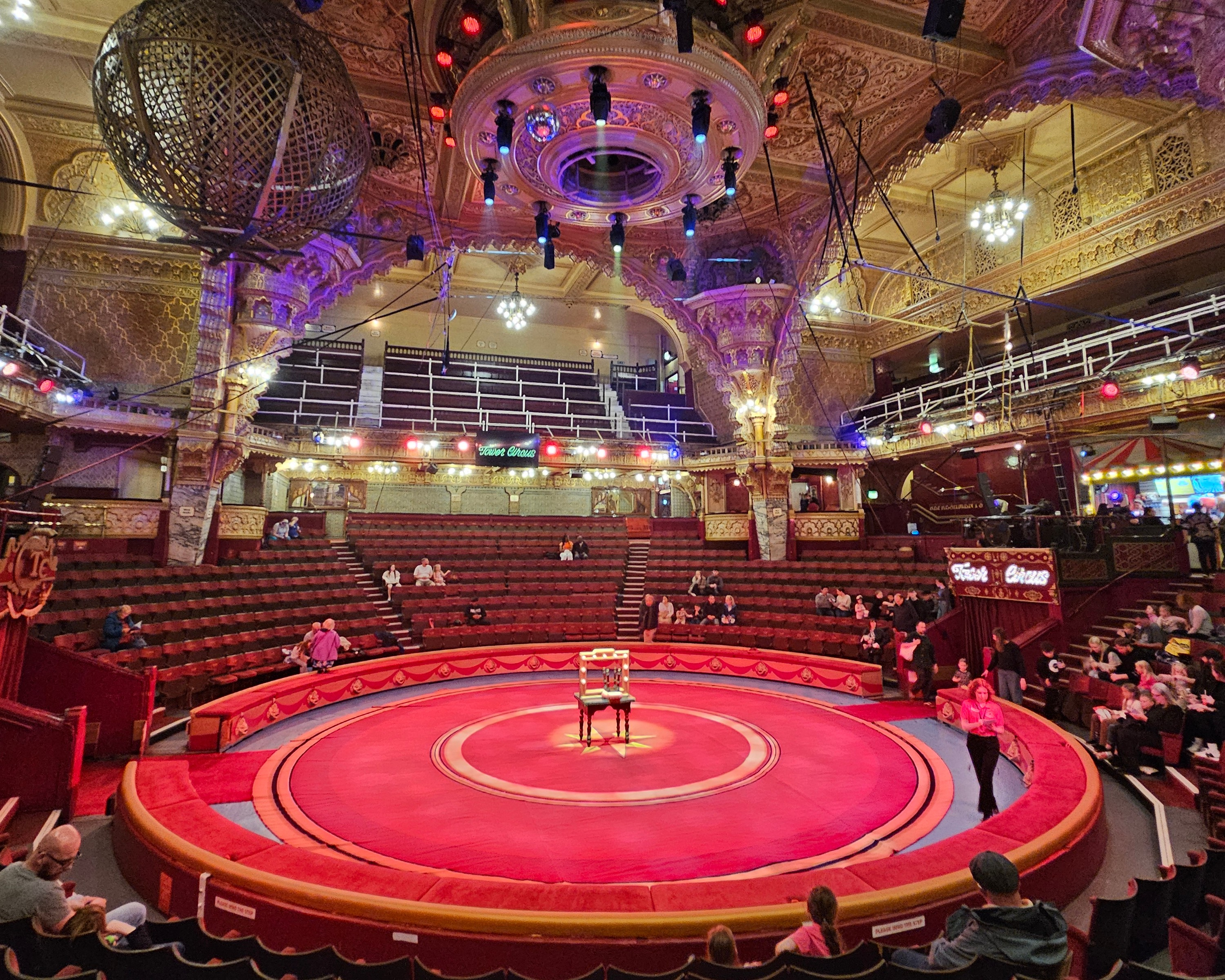
- The Blackpool Tower Circus Arena, pictured in May 2025 before the beginning of the show.

Origin
- Country: United Kingdom
- Year founded: 1894

Information
- Operator(s): The Endresz Family (circus show); Blackpool Tourism Ltd (arena)
- Ringmaster(s): Bubu Endresz (Mr Boo); Laci Endresz Jr. (Mooky the Clown)
- Director: Bubu Endresz; Laci Endresz Jr.
- Traveling show?: No
- Circus tent?: No
- Website: https://www.theblackpooltower.com/

Blackpool Tower Circus (often shortened to the Tower Circus) is a circus show which performs in The Blackpool Tower Circus arena, located inside The Blackpool Tower, Blackpool, Lancashire, England, United Kingdom. It has run continuously since 1894, with the arena being the oldest permanent circus arena still in use in the world.

The show's arena is one of only four circus arenas in the world with a sinking ring – where the hydraulic ring floor is lowered by 1.37 metres (4.5 ft) to allow 42,000 imperial gallons (190,000 L) of water to fill the ring in less than a minute. This is used the circus as part of a "water finale" with fountains.

The circus is also known for having resident clowns, most famous being Charlie Cairoli, who appear each year in the show. The current resident clowns are Mooky the Clown, who has been the head clown since 1999, and his brother Mr Boo.

== Show history ==
=== In-house production (1894–1982) ===
The Tower Circus opened on 14 May 1894, along with the rest of the Blackpool Tower. It was initially advertised as an aquatic and variety circus due to the sinking ring feature.

Animal acts included lions, elephants and sea-lions (which utilised the flooding ring), among others. The animals were held in pens backstage, and there were winter quarters for them in Staining. Other major acts in the early years included trapeze artists, high wire acts and trick cyclists. Acts involving people swimming in the water pool were discontinued after World War 2.

Clowning would usually include the resident clowns as well as regular guest appearances from other comedy troupes.

Ringmasters included George William Lockhart, George Claude Lockhart, Henry Lytton Jr. and from the 1966 until 1990 Norman Barrett was famously the ringmaster.

From 1975, Dick Hurran was the producer. He came from a variety background so introduced bigger budget shows with more animals. After Cairoli's death, the clown troupe The Rastellis were introduced in 1980. Hurran continued until 1982 when in-house production of the circus ended.

=== Peter Jay era (1983–1991) ===
Peter Jay (of the UK's other permanent circus – Great Yarmouth Hippodrome) took over for the 1983 season. His style of show was more modern and disco influenced. Clowning was varied year upon year during his run, with the Tony Alexis Trio starring in 1988, and David Larible in 1989.

Blackpool Tower owners First Leisure announced in May 1990 that they wanted to close the circus in favour of developing it into an animatronic attraction On 3 November 1990, the circus ceased, and the final show saw ringmaster Norman Barrett joined at the end by Jimmy Buchanan (stooge of Charlie Cairoli) to throw a single red rose into the water-filled ring.

While allowed to stage a Mexican Circus in the Tower Circus arena for the 1991 summer season, Peter Jay moved his version of the show to Blackpool Pleasure Beach and reopened it as Peter Jay's Superdome Circus.

=== Endresz family era (1992–present) ===
Various protests and campaigns to save Blackpool Tower Circus meant that First Leisure would backtrack and instead decided to contract out a new animal-free circus to operate in the arena. They chose Tip Top Entertainments – a company ran by Hungarian circus manager Laci Endresz Sr, and for the first few years David Barnes – to operate the new circus from 1992.

Endresz and Co initially ran the circus as three different short shows per day, each with different focuses – comedy, magic, and global acts. In 1993, this became two different shows per day, and in 1996 the show would return to a single full-length show that would be shown more than once per day.

For the first few years, clowning would be provided by various clowns brought in each year, with some seasons being filled in with Laci Endresz Sr himself as Mooky the Clown. In his act, he would often be joined by his family – most notably his sons Laci Endresz Jr (as Mini Mooky) and Bubu Endresz. During 1998, the role of Mooky would be transferred to Endresz Jr, who became the Tower Circus' new permanent resident clown from the 1999 summer season show onwards. Endresz Jr's Mooky was joined once again by Bubu in the clown act in 2008; with Bubu becoming Mr Boo, a White clown who acts as a straight man to Mooky.

From 1993 to 1995, a Christmas circus was produced over December. Then, from 1997 until 2020, the circus would stage a circus-pantomime – a hybrid of a traditional pantomime with circus. Latterly, it would feature Mooky the Clown and other resident performers in the pantomime roles. Other shows ran by the Endresz family included circus-based magic shows on Fridays in the late-2000s, and fortnight-long productions in February for Blackpool's Showzam! festival from 2008 to 2012.

The COVID-19 pandemic and the subsequent lockdowns in the United Kingdom saw the 2020 summer circus open in August, as opposed to the planned April, and close slightly earlier than planned at the start of November. The 2021 season also began late, with the first show running in late May. The circus has still not missed a season since its inception.

Since 2023, the show has run one production per year from early February until early November, with external productions such as the High Jinx Magic Show taking over the arena during the Festive season. Until it was discontinued, the circus-pantomime show ran from November until January – with the main season show running from March or April until early November. Currently, the shows last for two hours with an interval in the middle – and up to three shows are performed a day. The show features dancers and a live band alongside the clowns, circus acts and water finale.

Laci Endresz Sr retired from producing the show in 2025, with the responsibility passing to Laci Endresz Jr and Bubu Endresz.

== Resident clowns ==
The Blackpool Tower Circus is prolific for its tradition of having resident clowns, who return and perform there each season as the primary comedy component. They often perform at the Tower Circus for numerous decades and typically become local celebrities in Blackpool and the wider Fylde Coast.

This tradition emerged in the early years of the show, where the management would intentionally keep the same clowns each year. This was done as the show's audiences were often families who came to Blackpool each year and wanted to see the same familiar faces each time they visited. The resident clowns have regularly been given the nickname of the "Clown Princes" of Blackpool.

Usually, there is one main resident clown, who is more often than not an Auguste clown. They are typically joined by other clowns – often a White clown, and or alternatively other circus figures (such as stooges or ringmasters). The resident clowns typically make repeated appearances during the show:

Main Clown(s)	Image	Years Performed	Partner Clowns
Bob Kellino		1897–1903	Pim Pim (1899–1903)
August (Harold Wade) and September (John Albert Griffith)		1904–1909	
August (Robert Elliot) and September (John Albert Griffith)		1909–1915	
Doodles (William McAllister)		1915–1944	August (Robert Elliot) (1915–1926); Otherwise various.
Charlie Cairoli	Charlie Cairoli (left) with Jean-Marie Cairoli	1939–1979	Jean-Marie "Johnny" Cairoli (1939–1947); Paul Freeman (1948–1959); Jimmy Buchanan (1953–1979); Paul King (1960–1968); Paul Connor (1969–1973); Charlie Cairoli Jr. (1974–1979)
Coco (Nicolai Poliakoff)		1942–1946	Michael Polakovs (1942–1946)
The Rastellis		1980–1982	
Mooky the Clown (Laci Endresz Sr.)		1992–1998 (Note: Appeared irregularly – not in every season or production.)	Mini Mooky (Laci Endresz Jr.) (1992 – 1998); Bubu Endresz (1992 – 1998); Otherwise various.
Mooky the Clown (Laci Endresz Jr.)		1999–present	Laci Endresz Sr. and various (1999–2001); Mr Maxi (Attila Endresz) (2002–2006); Mr Maxi (Tom Fackrell) (2007); Mr Boo (Bubu Endresz) (2008–present) (Note: Has made irregularly appearances in various roles from 1992, but only as the character Mr Boo from 2008 onwards.)

While not the case in the past, the incumbent resident clowns Mooky and Mr Boo are also the main producers of the show and are responsible for the day-to-day operation of the circus. Bubu Endresz (Mr Boo) is in charge of the aerial rigging and is the main ringmaster of the show, while Laci Endresz Jr (Mooky) is the backstage co-ordinator and stage director.

Other clowns and comedy acts have appeared for single seasons. Some notable one off comedy performers include The Chuckle Brothers (1987), and Keith Harris with Orville the Duck (1999)

== Arena ==
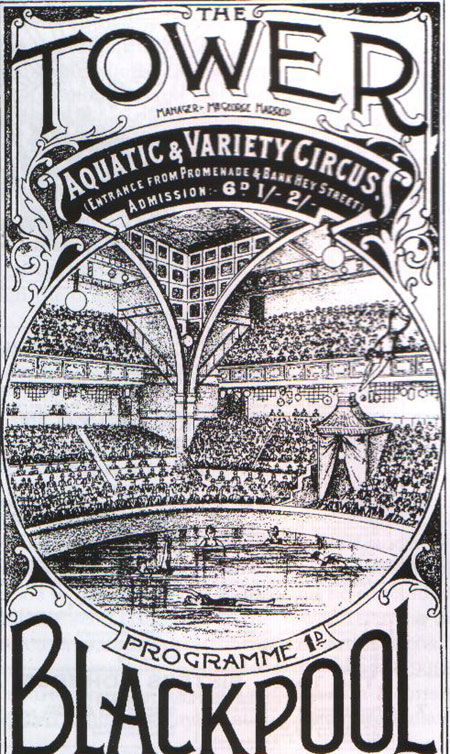
The circus' first programme, showing an illustration of the original interior

The circus arena is located immediately under the four legs of the Blackpool Tower. The current seating capacity is 1,350 – less than the original 1,500 due to adaptations made to fit modern accessibility requirements. Seating spans nearly the whole circumference of the ring, with two ring doors to the north and south of the ring. The live show band sit on top of the southern ring door. There are also four balconies with more seating, located between each pair of the tower's legs.

It was originally constructed, like the rest of the Blackpool Tower, by architects Maxwell and Tuke. Upon opening, the arena was much more sparsely decorated. The arena was redesigned into its current appearance from late 1899 to early 1900 by renowned theatre designer Frank Matcham, in order to compete with the Alhambra Circus located in the building directly north to the Tower. Ironically, Matcham's new design was based on the real Alhambra in Granada, Spain.

Later features added included the circular cupola in the centre of the ceiling and the gold fish heads around the ringfence – the latter added in 2003.

Restoration of the interior took place in late 2021 to early 2022. A time capsule was hidden in the arena after signatures from workmen in 1900 were discovered whilst restoring the ceiling.

The pens used for the animals still exist albeit unused – unable to be removed due to the listed status of the building.

=== Other uses ===
The Tower Circus' arena has been used for a multitude of other events. These include but are not limited to:

- Boxing and wrestling shows – held from the 1940s onwards through much of the 20th century. Jack Pye became a well known wrestler who performed regularly in the venue.
- Snooker – it was the location of the World Championship in 1950 and 1951, and in various years from 2011 onwards as the location of the Snooker Shoot Out.
- Peter Kay performed a comedy show here in 2000, which was filmed and became his Live at the Top of the Tower comedy special.
- It has also been used for music events, such as a filmed concert for The Lathums in 2020.

As well as hosting events, the arena has also been used as a filming location, most notably so in Valentino (1977) Funny Bones (1995) and Miss Peregrine's Home for Peculiar Children (2016).
