= Madame Tussauds Blackpool =

Wax museum in Blackpool, England

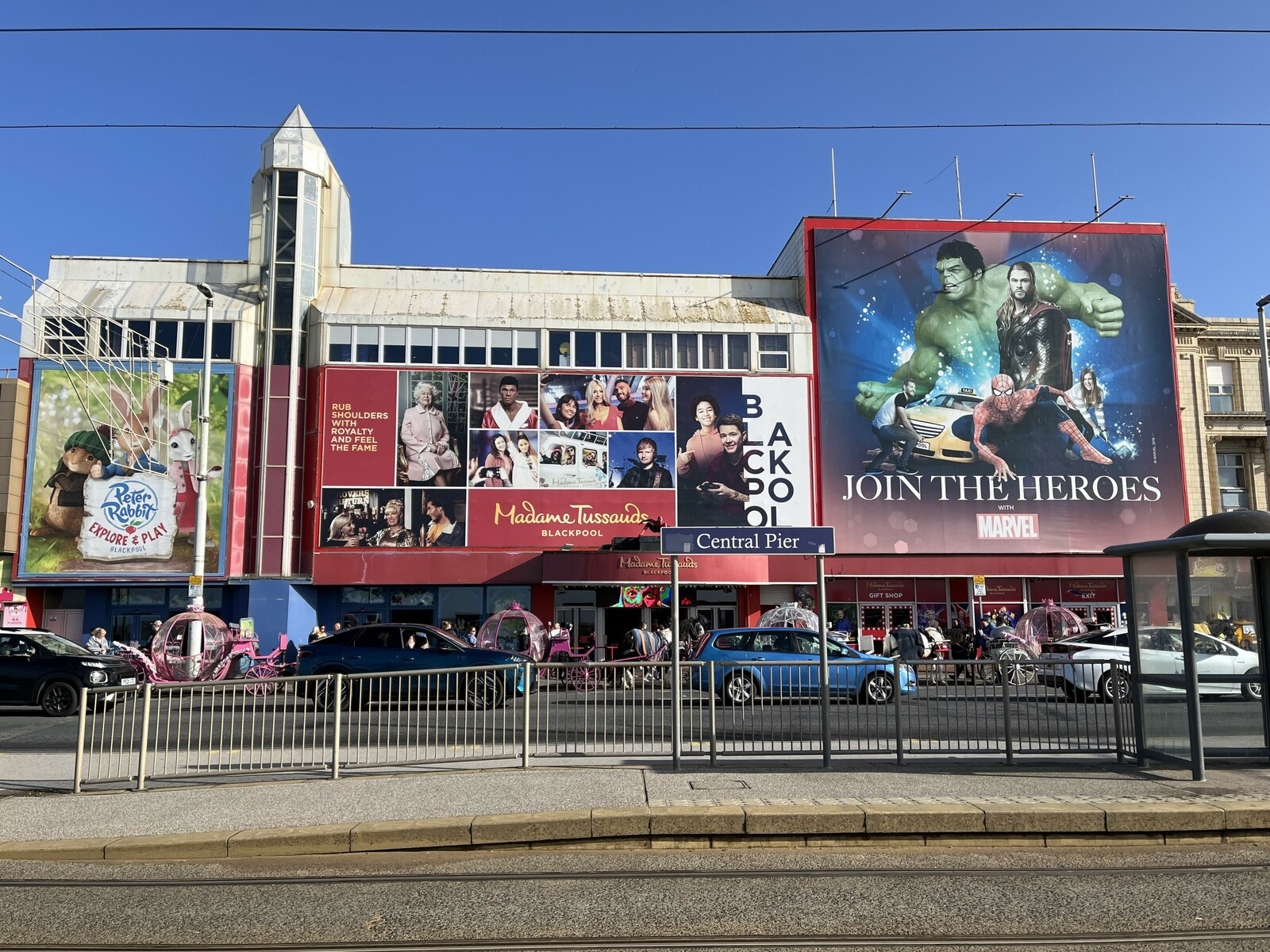
- The exterior of the building, pictured in October 2024.
- Established: 2011; 15 years ago
- Location: Blackpool Promenade, Blackpool, Lancashire, England, United Kingdom
- Founder: Marie Tussaud
- Website: http://www.madametussauds.com/blackpool

Madame Tussauds Blackpool is a wax museum located in Blackpool, United Kingdom. The attraction opened in 2011, replacing the previous Louis Tussauds Waxworks. It features over 80 wax figures of celebrities, film and television characters, athletes and musicians.

== History ==
Louis Tussauds Waxworks first opened in Blackpool in 1900, located in the basement of the Hippodrome Theatre on Church Street. It moved to the Brunswick Café in South Shore, before reopening in the modern day location in 1929.

In March 2010, it was confirmed that a deal had been made between Blackpool Council and Leisure Parcs to purchase some of Blackpool's highest profile landmarks. The deal, totalling £38.9m, had national and local government backing and included the purchase of Blackpool Tower, Winter Gardens, Louis Tussauds Waxworks, and the Sea Life Centre. Merlin Entertainments were announced as the new operators of Blackpool Tower and Louis Tussauds. The waxworks was refurbished and rebranded as Madame Tussauds Blackpool.

In August 2025, management switched to Blackpool Tourism Ltd - a company owned by Blackpool Council, with Merlin Entertainments leasing the Madame Tussauds name to them as part of a franchise agreement.

== Notable figures ==
Entertainment	Music Stars	Royal	Politics	Sport	A-List Awards Party	Characters	Coronation Street	Strictly Come Dancing
Paddy McGuinness	Olly Murs	King Charles III	Boris Johnson	Wayne Rooney	Beyoncé	E.T.	Jack P. Shepherd as David Platt	Craig Revel Horwood
Simon Cowell	Ed Sheeran	William, Prince of Wales	Theresa May	Lewis Hamilton	Lady Gaga	Iron Man	William Roache as Ken Barlow	Tess Daly
Keith Lemon	Stormzy	Catherine, Princess of Wales	David Cameron	Joe Hart	RuPaul	Spider-Man	Julie Goodyear as Bet Lynch	Claudia Winkleman
Gok Wan	Michael Jackson	Queen Elizabeth II		Phil Taylor	Angelina Jolie	Captain America	Anne Kirkbride as Deirdre Barlow	Bruce Forsyth
Bear Grylls	Peter Andre			Anthony Joshua	Brad Pitt	Captain Marvel	Jean Alexander as Hilda Ogden	
Ant and Dec	Freddie Mercury			Conor McGregor	Emma Watson	Hulk	Bill Tarmey as Jack Duckworth	
The Two Ronnies	Ariana Grande			Steven Gerrard	Johnny Depp	Rocket Raccoon	Liz Dawn as Vera Duckworth	
Tommy Cooper	Amy Winehouse			Nicola Adams	Nicole Kidman	Groot	Kym Marsh as Michelle Connor	
Morecambe and Wise	Justin Bieber			Mo Farah	Kate Winslet	Thor		
Gary Barlow	Justin Timberlake			Alan Shearer	Britney Spears			
Hugh Bonneville	The Beatles				Julia Roberts			
Ken Dodd	Shirley Bassey							
Alan Carr	Harry Styles							
John Bishop	Cheryl							
DanTDM	Calvin Harris							
Barbara Windsor	Sam Smith							
Brian Cox	KSI							
David Attenborough	Susan Boyle							
Alison Hammond	Lewis Capaldi							
Amanda Holden	Taylor Swift							
