= Blackpool Tourism Limited =

Tourist attraction operator based in Blackpool, England

- Formerly: Blackpool Operating Company Limited (BOCL) (1983–2025)
- Type: Local Authority Trading Company
- Industry: Entertainment
- Founded: 1983 (as BOCL); 4 June 2025; 16 months ago (as Blackpool Tourism Limited)
- Headquarters: Blackpool, England
- Key people: Kate Shane MBE (Managing Director)
- Owners: Blackpool Council
- Website: https://www.blackpooltourism.com/

Blackpool Tourism Limited (often abbreviated to Blackpool Tourism Ltd or to BTL) is a local authority-owned tourism company which operates numerous attractions in the British resort town of Blackpool - namely the Blackpool Tower, Sandcastle Waterpark, Showtown, the Winter Gardens and Madame Tussauds Blackpool.

It is owned by Blackpool Council, who founded the company in 2025 to operate their owned attractions, which they had previously contracted operation for to Merlin Entertainments from 2010.

== History ==
=== Prior to company launch ===
Blackpool Tourism Limited was originally Blackpool Operating Company Limited (BOCL) - a private company who operated the Sandcastle Waterpark on behalf of Blackpool Council. The company was bought by the council in 2003 and turned into a Local Authority Trading Company.

In 2010, Blackpool Council struck a deal with Leisure Parcs, the Trevor Hemmings-owned Blackpool tourism company, to purchase their attractions - which consisted of the Blackpool Tower, Winter Gardens and Louis Tussauds Waxworks - for £38.9 Million. With exception of the Winter Gardens, which would be run separately, the Council contracted Merlin Entertainments to operate the Tower and the Waxworks. For a two-year period starting in August 2022, operation of the Sandcastle Waterpark was transferred from BOCL to Merlin Entertainments.

In August 2024, Kate Shane, head of Merlin's Blackpool attractions, became managing director of Blackpool Operating Company Ltd. BOCL would take over operation of the town's Showtown Museum in February 2025.

=== As Blackpool Tourism Ltd ===
On June 4, 2025, it was announced that the remaining council-owned attractions in Blackpool would no longer be operated by Merlin and instead be ran by Blackpool Operating Company Ltd, which in the process would be rebranded as Blackpool Tourism Ltd (BTL). BTL took over operation of the attractions from 1 August 2025.

Blackpool Tourism Ltd were announced as the sponsors of Blackpool FC's third football kit for the 2025/26 season in July 2025. In November 2025, BTL introduced an annual pass which allows passholders to make unlimited visits to attractions over a one-year period. They also introduced the WaveRider bundle ticket, which - through a deal with Pleasure Beach Resort - gave access to both Pleasure Beach and Sandcastle Waterpark.

On February 5, 2026, it was announced that the Winter Gardens, operated by another Blackpool Council subsidiary - Blackpool Entertainment Company Ltd (BECL), would be transferred to Blackpool Tourism Limited. As part of the transfer, BECL would be dissolved. In March 2026, BTL launched the Ultimate Ticket - a £65 ticket bundle which includes admission to the following: their Blackpool Tower attractions (except the Ballroom and Dino Golf), Madame Tussauds, Sandcastle Waterpark and, like the WaveRider ticket, Pleasure Beach. They also added the SkyThrills ticket (all of the above except Sandcastle Waterpark) and the SkyRider (all of the above except Pleasure Beach), both for £50 per person.

== Attractions operated by Blackpool Tourism Ltd ==
=== Within the Blackpool Tower ===
Name	Photo	Year opened	Year acquired	Notes
Blackpool Tower Ballroom		1894	2025	
Blackpool Tower Circus		1894	2025	
The Blackpool Tower Dungeon		2011	2025	"Dungeons" brand is used on franchise agreement with Merlin Entertainments.
Blackpool Tower Top		1894	2025	Formerly known as the Blackpool Tower Eye.

=== Other Blackpool Attractions ===
Name	Photo	Year opened	Year acquired	Notes
Madame Tussauds Blackpool		2011	2025	"Madame Tussauds" brand is used through franchise agreement with Merlin Entertainments.
Sandcastle Waterpark		1986	1986	Formerly operated by BOCL.
Showtown	The entrance to the Showtown museum in Blackpool, Lancashire, England.	2024	2025	Formerly operated by BOCL.
Winter Gardens		1878	2026	Formerly operated by another Blackpool Council-owned company, Blackpool Entertainment Company Ltd.
