= Sandcastle Waterpark (Blackpool) =

Waterpark in Blackpool, England

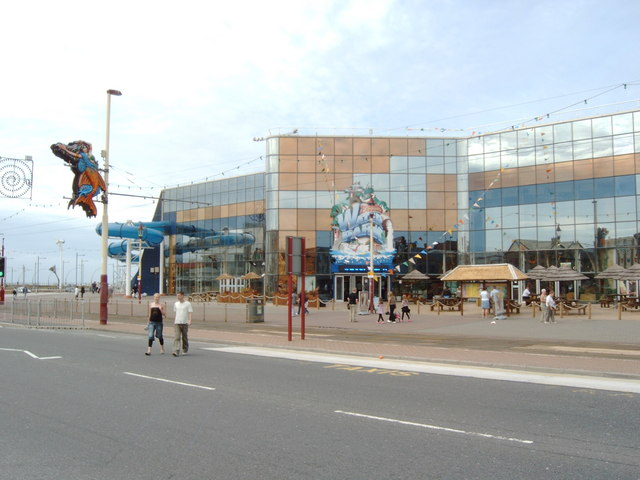
- The attraction exterior, as seen from Blackpool Promenade, in 2007.
- Interactive map of Sandcastle Waterpark
- Slogan: The UK's largest indoor waterpark
- Location: Blackpool, Lancashire, England
- Coordinates: 53.7941°N 3.0574°W
- Owner: Blackpool Council
- Operated by: Blackpool Tourism Ltd
- Opened: 26 June 1986

Sandcastle Waterpark is an indoor waterpark with 18 water slides and other attractions in Blackpool, Lancashire, England.

Sandcastle Waterpark is also home to slides such as the world's longest indoor roller-coaster water slide, the Master Blaster, and the first vertical indoor drop slide, the Sidewinder.

Family attractions include the Ushi Gushi Action River, the Shimmering Shallows and the Typhoon Lagoon Wavepool.

For younger people there is the Caribbean Storm Treehouse, an interactive adventure play area with a large tipping coconut. There are also a range of water cannons, mini slides and jets within the HMS Thundersplash and Fort Riptide areas.

== History ==
Sandcastle opened on 26 June 1986 on the site of the former South Shore Open Air Baths as a joint public/private partnership. Operation of the facility was taken back into Blackpool Council ownership in 2003. A significant investment in new attractions costing £5.5M was also agreed, which was delivered in two phases, with the second opening in 2006 on time and on budget.

In 2012, Sandcastle opened two new Aztec-themed slides, one with a chamber called 'Aztec Falls', and a toboggan-like slide called 'Montazooma'.

Sandcastle Waterpark celebrated its 30th birthday in 2016 with a monthlong series of events involving a variety of local charities and community groups. On 26 June 2016 as part of these celebrations, the waterpark regained the world record for most riders (529) down a waterslide in one hour. The previous record had stood to a Dutch waterpark at 396 riders.

In 2022, management of the facility was awarded by Blackpool Council to Merlin Entertainments for a two-year period. By June 2025, Blackpool Council were operating the attraction in-house once again, and in August operation transferred to their new tourism company Blackpool Tourism Ltd.

== Slides and attractions ==
Key:

Colour	Target Audience
	Thrill ride
	Family ride

#	Name	Opened	Description
1	Masterblaster	2004	This was the first water slide in the park. It is the UK's longest indoor rollercoaster waterslide.
2	Sidewinder	2009	A combination wet and dry raft ride by Aqua Leisure that propels riders from side to side within the Half-pipe in a single or double person raft. Water spray jets provide a frictionless surface on the large U-shaped slide as rafts are channelled to the bottom.
3	Aztec Falls	2012	A water slide which starts from the rooftop, plunges into a dark, swirling chasm and finishes with a corkscrew exit.
4	Montazooma	2012	A water slide with 360-degree loops and back to back turns which starts from the rooftop and races from beginning to end in 20 seconds.
5	Ushi-Gushi River Creek		An action Lazy river running anticlockwise.
6	Thunder Falls		Two 300 ft waterslides - These are the original slides, opened in 1986.
7	Fort Riptide		A rock based fort with water cannons and slides.
8	HMS Thundersplash		A marooned galleon with waterjets and cannons.
9	Caribbean Storm Treehouse		Interactive adventure play area and 600 gallon giant tipping coconut.
10	Treetops Water Chutes		Family friendly water chutes where 3 riders can race together.
11	Dueling Dragons		Two fast closed tubes; one called Barracuda (green) and the other called Serpent (red). On 26 June 2016, the red Serpent slide was used in the successful world record attempt for most people down a waterslide in one hour with 529 riders, comfortably beating the previous record of 396 people.
12	Lagoon Bay		A shallow water area with hidden water cannons.
13	Shimmerin Shallows		An activity area for young children.
14	Typhoon Lagoon		A wave pool which replicates the movement of the ocean.
15	Coconut Bay		A seating area used for people.
16	Sea Breeze Spa		Sauna, Steam Room, Aromatherapy Room, Salt Inhalation Room, Heated Foot Spas, Heated Tile Loungers.
17	Barrel Blast		Guests push a plunger to "blow-up" barrels over people in the Ushi Gushi Action River below.
18	Monkey Island		A themed seating area used for Birthday Parties and functions.
19	Super Soaker		The UK's biggest water cannon.

=== Other attractions ===
- Swim Shack – Swimwear and accessories shop
- WatersEdge Kitchen/Snack Bar – Food and drink outlet inside the Waterpark
- Waterfalls – Food and drink outlet which is accessible to non-swimmers from the Promenade
- Treetops Trading Post – Souvenirs and branded merchandise

== World records ==
- 2016: Sandcastle Waterpark sets a new world record on Sunday 26 June 2016 for the most people down a waterslide in one hour when 529 people smash the previous record of 396.
- 2014: Sandcastle Waterpark took part in the World's Largest Swimming Lesson, helping set the record at 36,564 participants over 22 countries.
- 2013: Sandcastle Waterpark took part in the Worlds Largest Swimming Lesson. As part of the event Sandcastle Waterpark was recognised as hosting the largest number of participants in the UK. The Guinness World Record was set at 24,873 participants, 432 facilities in 13 countries.
- 2012: Sandcastle Waterpark was an official host location for The World’s Largest Swimming Lesson, which set a new world record on 11 June 2012 for the largest simultaneous swimming lesson ever conducted.
- 2008: Ten soldiers set a new world record for the longest distance spent on a water slide. Signaller Mark McCluggage and 9 other soldiers raised over £10,000 for charity by spending 24 hours continually sliding down the Thunderfalls slide.

== In popular culture ==
- Mr Tumble and Justin Fletcher from CBeebies filmed at Sandcastle Waterpark for the TV series, Something Special in June 2012.
- The Dandy Warhols used footage filmed outside Sandcastle Waterpark in the music video for their single "Autumn Carnival".
