= First Leisure Corporation =

First Leisure Corporation plc was a leisure operator in the United Kingdom active between 1981 and 2004.

Originally based in Soho Square, London, and with other offices in Blackpool and Leicester, its operations included Blackpool Tower, the town's Winter Gardens and all three Blackpool piers, as well as five other piers, health and fitness clubs, nightclubs and bars, tenpin bowling centres and other mainstream UK high street entertainment venues.

In the mid 1980s there were four divisions Nightclubs, Parks, and leisure (Caravan parks) which included the piers, Sports which included racket and badminton centres, etc. and the fourth division was Bowling. Some of the original nightclubs included The Empire Square Ballroom, Leicester Square; Romeo & Juliet's Sheffield, Romeo and Juliet's Blackburn, Pink Coconut Derby, Slick Chick's fun pub Derby, The Dome (formerly the Old Nightout Club) Birmingham which was the first club in the division to turn over 1 million pounds pa outside of London and Pagoda Park, Birmingham.

In 2000, a management buyout (MBO) led by Candover and supported by 3i and PPM Ventures saw First Leisure shed all but its Nightclubs and Bars division, which retained the First Leisure brand and consisted of approximately fifty mainstream high street venues. The MBO saw the company de-listing from the stock exchange (whilst retaining its plc status) and moving its operations to Leicester.

At that time, the Health and Fitness chain was spun off as Esporta.

By 2004, the company had shrunk its operations from 50 to 25 nightclubs; in so doing, it had sold its premises leases to rival operators. A clause of such sales mandated that should those new operators be unable to meet their obligations under the leases they would be automatically reassigned to First Leisure with little warning or ceremony.

At the end of 2004, such an automatic reassignment took place following competitors' defaults on several previously sold leases. Unable to meet the dramatically increased month-to-month obligations brought about by this mandatory re-acquisition, the company was subject to a Winding Order by a trade creditor and hence placed into Compulsory Liquidation by the Official Receiver.

A 'Phoenix' company, named The Nightclub Company, was formed virtually immediately by the incumbent management team. Such an operation was short-lived, however, and it too was placed into administration in 2005. The precise circumstances regarding the collapse of TNC are unclear.

The remaining leases were sold, mostly to long-time rival Luminar Leisure.

All that remains of the corporation as of 2007 is the Esporta health and fitness chain.

== See also ==
- Bernard Delfont (chief executive, president)
