= Charlie Cairoli =

Italian-British clown (1910–1980)

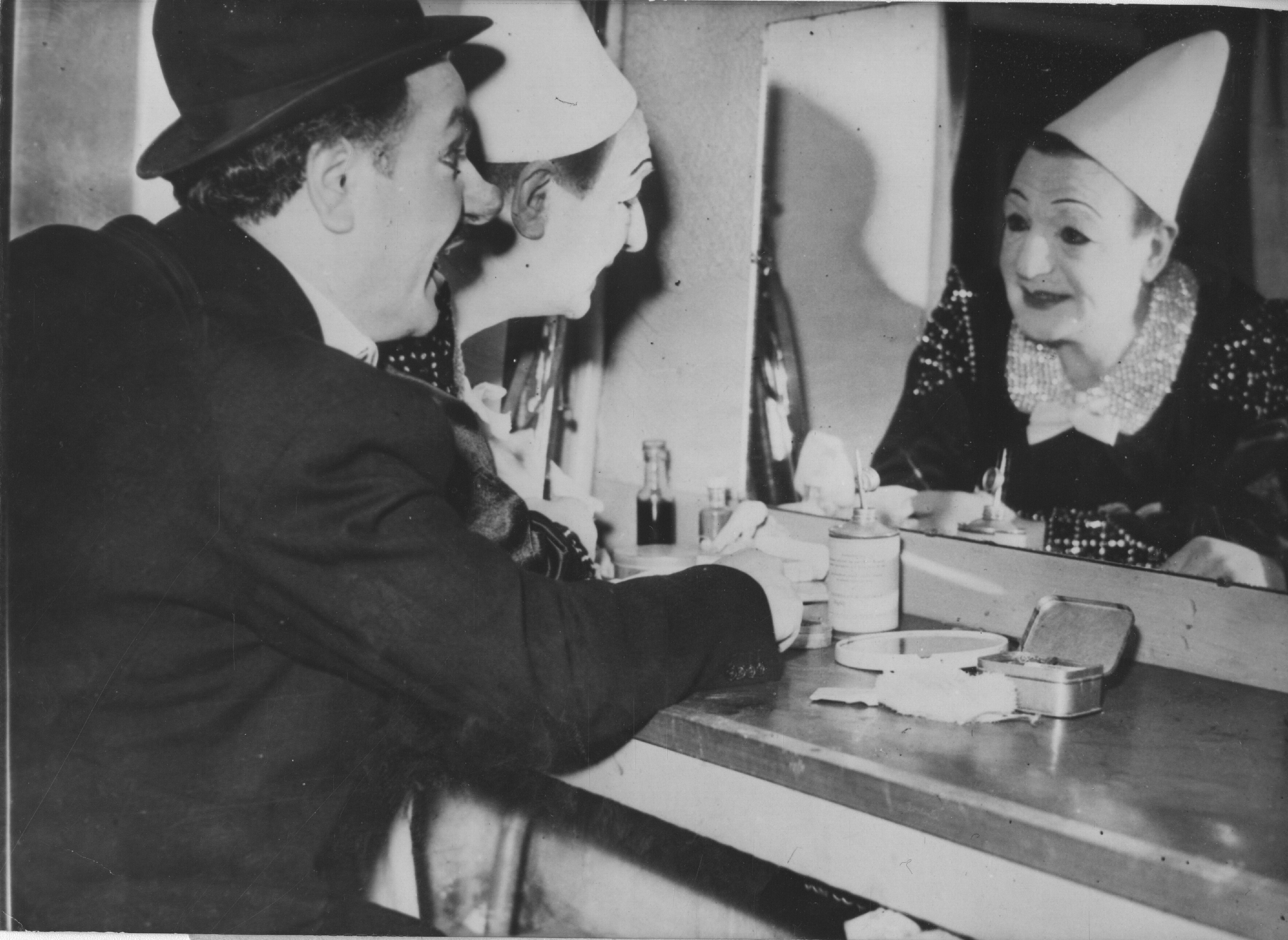
- Cairoli Brothers
- Born: 15 February 1910; Affori, Milan, Italy
- Died: 17 February 1980 (aged 70); Blackpool, England
- Other name: Carletto
- Spouse: Violetta Fratellini

Comedy career
- Years active: 1917–1979
- Medium: Circus, theatre, television

Hubert Jean Charles Cairoli (15 February 1910 – 17 February 1980) was an Italian-English clown, impressionist and musician.

== Background and career ==
Born in Affori, Milan, Italy to a travelling circus family of French origin, he began his performing career at the age of seven, under the name 'Carletto'. He met Violetta Fratellini, who was also from a circus family, in 1934 when they were both working at the Cirque Medrano at Montmartre: he was with his father, Jean-Marie Cairoli (1879–1956), in a clown act as 'The Cairoli Brothers', and she was in a knockabout acrobatic act, 'The Tomboys Girls'. While she watched him perform he spotted her, and serenaded her on his clarinet. By Christmas that same year they were married.

In early 1939 the Cairolis appeared at the Circus Krone in Munich, in a special performance attended by Adolf Hitler, who afterward presented Cairoli with a watch. In September, when the Second World War broke out, Cairoli was performing at the Blackpool Tower Circus for the first time; in response to the news of war, he walked to the end of North Pier in Blackpool and threw the watch into the Irish Sea. He chose to stay in the town, where he lived for the rest of his life.

In 1943 he appeared in Happidrome a film based on the radio series of the same name, with his father. In 1952 he appeared in the crime drama film, Secret People. On 11 and 25 November 1962 he performed his clown act on the American television variety show, The Ed Sullivan Show on CBS. On 1 January 1966 he appeared on David Nixon's Comedy Bandbox. He also appeared on the American television variety show on ABC The Hollywood Palace twice in 1966, first on 8 January, performing as Charles Cairoli and Company then on 7 May when he was introduced as a "British Comic Pantomimist".

Cairoli was distinguished in his act by wearing a red nose and a Charlie Chaplin-style bowler hat, eyebrows, and costume, and a moustache slightly larger than Chaplin's. He rose to prominence in the United Kingdom in the 1970s owing to his frequent television appearances, not least on his long-running children's show Right Charlie!. He was possibly the best-known clown on British television at one time, and had a career that spanned well over forty years.

He was the subject of This Is Your Life in 1970 when he was surprised by Eamonn Andrews at London's Wembley Arena.

He performed at Blackpool Tower Circus every summer season for forty years, a world record for the most performances at a single venue. Out of season he also performed on stage in variety shows and pantomime, including the Grand Theatre in Leeds and Alhambra in Bradford. His appearance in Jack and the Beanstalk in 1972 was the most successful pantomime at Leeds City Varieties and later that year he brought Christmas shopping to a standstill as he led hundreds of youngsters through the streets of Leeds and herded them to the City Varieties where he gave a special show to 600 invited children.

In June 1979, ill health forced his withdrawal from the Tower Circus ring and he was admitted to hospital suffering from exhaustion. He finally announced his retirement in November of that year; he was 69.

== Awards ==
In February 2000 in Blackpool, Cairoli was awarded a posthumous Lifetime Achievement award from the World's Fair circus newspaper. It was presented to his widow Violetta by ventriloquist Keith Harris, in the presence of the television personality Jeremy Beadle.

== Personal life ==
Cairoli had three children with his wife, Violetta. He died peacefully in his sleep at his home, 129 Warley Road, North Shore, Blackpool, on 17 February 1980, aged 70. Five days later he was cremated at Carleton Crematorium in Poulton-le-Fylde, where he is commemorated at rose bed 64.

His son, Charlie Cairoli Junior, adapted the role his father had made famous, although performing more cabaret and pantomime rather than in the circus. Violetta died in Blackpool on 16 November 2002.

== Cultural legacy ==
Charlie Cairoli's name entered popular usage as a reference for clowns in general. The 2004 Chumbawamba song "Just Desserts", (about pieing) explicitly compared Cairoli's clown behaviour to the anarchist viewpoints espoused by Peter Kropotkin. Similarly, when Garry Bushell criticised The Verdict, he said that "to call it Clown Court would be an insult to Charlie Cairoli". Welsh pop group The Hepburns recorded a song entitled, "Charlie Cairoli's Ghost".

In July 2008, Blackpool Council cabinet member, Tony Williams called for the erection of a statue of Cairoli in the resort, saying, "I have always wanted a statue of Charlie Cairoli in the town; after all he was the most famous clown in the world and brought more visitors to the town than any other single entertainer. Charlie has never been truly recognised for his massive contribution to Blackpool and we should honour our local heroes." The statue was subsequently erected in Blackpool's Stanley Park, but became the target of constant vandalism; on 23 October 2013, the statue was moved to within Blackpool Tower.

Cairoli is mentioned in the 2014 television film Marvellous due to his friendship with the film's subject Neil Baldwin. Baldwin himself is a registered clown and used to perform in the circus which helped him to land his dream job as kitman at Stoke City.

In October 2018 Cairoli was honoured with his own Blackpool Heritage Tram - Boatcar 227 in red and ivory livery restored by the Civic Trust to its 1934 condition, with an image of his face on it, and nicknamed "Charlie's Tram".
