= Blackpool Tower =

Tourist attraction in Blackpool, England

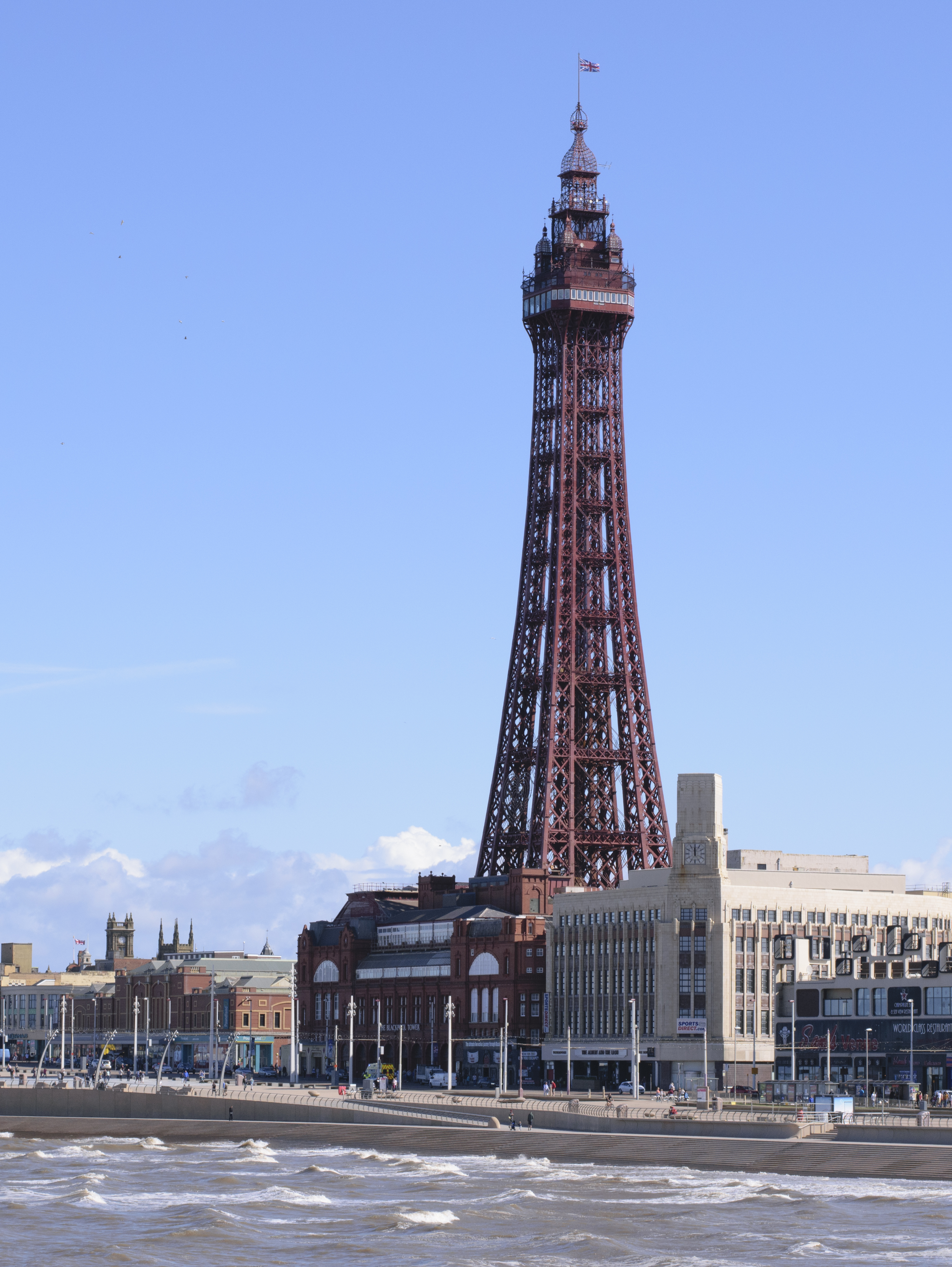
- Looking northeast

- Location within Blackpool Location within England

General information
- Type: Observation Tower, Radio Tower, Tourist Attraction
- Location: Blackpool, Lancashire, England
- Coordinates: 53°48′57″N 3°03′19″W
- Construction started: 1891
- Completed: 1894
- Opening: 14 May 1894 (132 years ago)
- Operator: Blackpool Tourism Ltd

Height
- Roof: 518 ft 9 in (158.1 m)

Design and construction
- Architects: Maxwell and Tuke
- Structural engineer: Heenan & Froude
- Designations

Listed Building – Grade I
- Official name: Tower Buildings
- Designated: 10 October 1973
- Reference no.: 1205810

Website
- www.theblackpooltower.com

Blackpool Tower is a tourist attraction in Blackpool, Lancashire, England, which was opened to the public on 14 May 1894. When it opened, Blackpool Tower was the tallest man-made structure in the British Empire. Inspired by the Eiffel Tower in Paris, France, it is 518 feet (158 metres) tall and was once the 125th-tallest freestanding tower in the world. Blackpool Tower is also the common name for the Tower Buildings, an entertainment complex in a red-brick three-storey block that comprises the tower, Tower Circus, the Tower Ballroom, and roof gardens, which was designated a Grade I listed building in 1973.

== History ==
=== Background and construction ===
The Blackpool Tower Company was founded by London-based Standard Contract & Debenture Corporation in 1890; it bought an aquarium, owned by William Cocker, on Central Promenade with the intention of building a replica Eiffel Tower on the site. John Bickerstaffe, a former mayor of Blackpool, was asked to become chairman of the new company, and its shares went on sale in July 1891. The prospectus occupied the whole of page 6 of The Financial Times of 25 July 1891. The Standard Corporation kept 30,000 £1 shares and offered £150,000 worth of shares to the public; initially only two-thirds were taken up, forcing the company to ask for more cash contributions from its existing shareholders, but the poor financial situation of the company, exacerbated by the falling share price, rendered it unable to pay creditors. Bickerstaffe, to avoid the potential collapse of the venture, bought any available shares until his original holding of £500 amounted to £20,000. He also released the Standard Corporation from its share commitments. When the Tower opened in 1894, its success justified the investment of nearly £300,000, and the company made a £30,000 profit in 1896.

Two Lancashire architects, James Maxwell and Charles Tuke, designed the tower and oversaw the laying of its foundation stone on 29 September 1891. By the time the Tower finally opened on 14 May 1894, both men had died. Heenan & Froude, then of Manchester, were appointed structural engineers, supplying and constructing both the tower, the electric lighting and the steel front pieces for the aquariums. A new system of hydraulic riveting was used, based on the technology of Fielding & Platt of Gloucester.

The total cost for the design and construction of the tower and buildings was about £290,000. Five million Accrington bricks, 3,478 long tons (3,534 t) of steel and 352 long tons (358 t) of cast iron were used to construct the tower and base. Its base is hidden by the building that houses Blackpool Tower Circus. The building occupies a total of 6,040 square yards (1.25 acres; 5,050 m^{2}). At the summit of the tower there is a flagpole where the height at the top measures 518 feet 9 inches (158.12 m) from the ground. A time capsule was buried under the foundation stone on 25 September 1891.

The tower's design was ahead of its time. As a writer for the BBC noted: "In heavy winds the building will gently sway, what a magnificent Victorian engineering masterpiece."

=== Operation ===
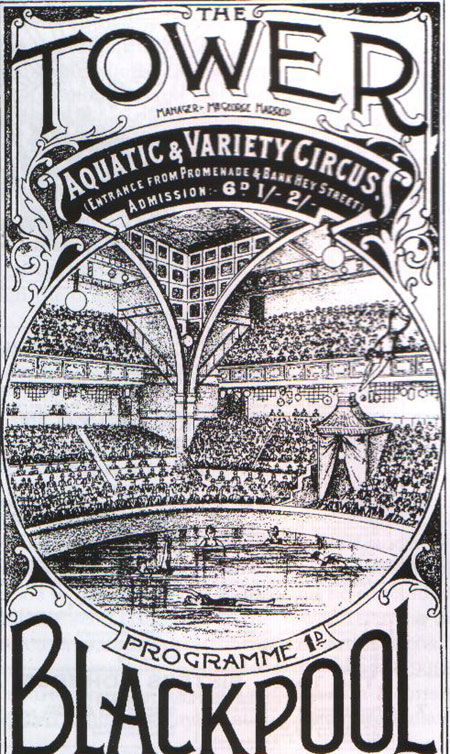
Blackpool Tower's first circus programme

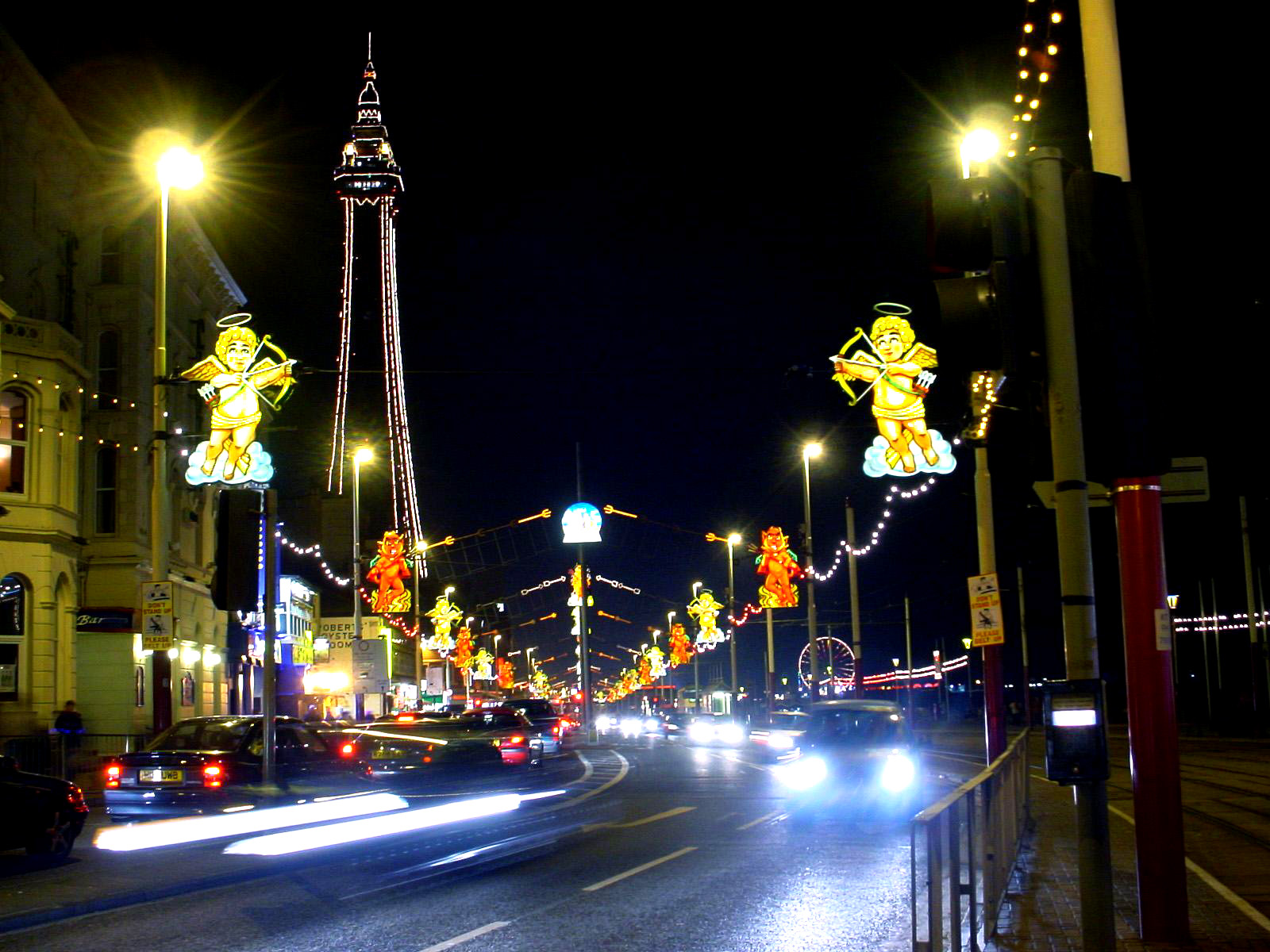
The Tower and Illuminations

On the day the Tower opened, 3,000 customers took the first rides to the top. Tourists paid sixpence for admission, sixpence more for a ride in the lifts to the top, and a further sixpence for the circus. The first members of the public to ascend the tower had been local journalists in September 1893, using constructors' ladders. The top of the Tower caught fire in 1897, and the platform was seen on fire from up to 50 miles (80 km) away.

The Tower was not painted properly during its first thirty years and became corroded, leading to discussions about demolishing it. However, it was decided to rebuild it instead, and all the steelwork in the structure was replaced and renewed between 1920 and 1924. On 22 December 1894, Norwegian ship Abana was sailing from Liverpool to Savannah, Georgia, but was caught up in a storm, and mistook the recently built Blackpool Tower for a lighthouse. Abana was first seen off North Pier, and later drifted to Little Bispham where she was wrecked, and can still be seen at low tide. The ship's bell still hangs in St Andrews Church in Cleveleys.

In 1940, during the Second World War, the crow's nest was removed to allow the structure to be used as a Royal Air Force radar station known as 'RAF Tower', which proved unsuccessful.

A post box was opened at the top of the tower in 1949. The hydraulic lifts to the top of the tower were replaced in 1956–57 and the winding-gear was converted to use an electric motor.

In the 1960s, some of the arches had been made into kiosks and a veranda/glass canopy had been put across the front of the Tower. This had been done by cutting a metre-wide channel across the arches, knocking off any projections such as keystones and leading edges, and welding to the exposed steel. The fanlights had been badly damaged or panelled. Black bitumen paint had been applied liberally.

The top of the tower was painted silver in 1977 as part of Queen Elizabeth's Silver Jubilee celebrations. A giant model of King Kong was placed on the side of the tower in 1984. In 1985, escapologist Karl Bartoni and his bride were married suspended in a cage from the tower.

The lifts and winding gear were again replaced in 1992. The same year, the tower complex was renamed Tower World, and was opened by Diana, Princess of Wales. The tower is usually painted in dark red, except for its centenary year in 1994 when it was painted gold by abseiling painters. In 1998, a "Walk of Faith" glass floor panel was opened at the top of the tower. Made up of two sheets of laminated glass, it weighs half a tonne and is two inches thick. In October 2007, a laser beam installed on the Tower for the duration of the annual Illuminations was criticised by astronomer Sir Patrick Moore, presenter of television programme The Sky at Night, who said: "Light pollution is a huge problem. I am not saying we should turn all the lights out, that is not practical, but there are some things which are very unnecessary. The Blackpool Tower light is certainly something I do not think we should be doing. I very much oppose it." The beam could be seen 30 miles (48 km) away; Moore called for it to be stopped. The centre for Astrophysics at the University of Central Lancashire in Preston said the laser has added to a spiralling problem affecting astronomy.

The tower has transmitters for local FM station Radio Wave 96.5 and some non-broadcast services.

The tower continued to be owned by the Bickerstaffe family until 1964, when the Blackpool Tower Company was sold to EMI. Since then it has been owned by Trust House Forte, First Leisure Corporation, and Leisure Parcs Ltd, owned by Trevor Hemmings. In March 2010, it was announced that Blackpool Council had bought Blackpool Tower, and that the Merlin Entertainment Group would manage it and add various attractions, including a new Dungeon attraction and a new observation deck called Blackpool Tower Eye.

On 12 December 2021, the tower was evacuated after reports of smoke. Fire services found it was caused by an electrical fault in a neighbouring property.

On 28 December 2023, at around 14:15 GMT, flames were reported close to the top of the tower. Lancashire Fire & Rescue responded with six fire engines, a drone team and rope rescue. In addition to this, LFRS were also supported by a helicopter from the National Police Air Service. Later that day, at around 16:30 GMT, it was revealed that the 'flames' were in fact orange netting that was blowing in the wind.

In 2025, it was announced that the Tower would be taken over from Merlin Entertainments and operated by Blackpool Council under a new company, Blackpool Tourism Ltd, from August. The Blackpool Dungeons continue to operate under a franchise agreement with Merlin.

== Current attractions ==
=== Blackpool Tower Top ===
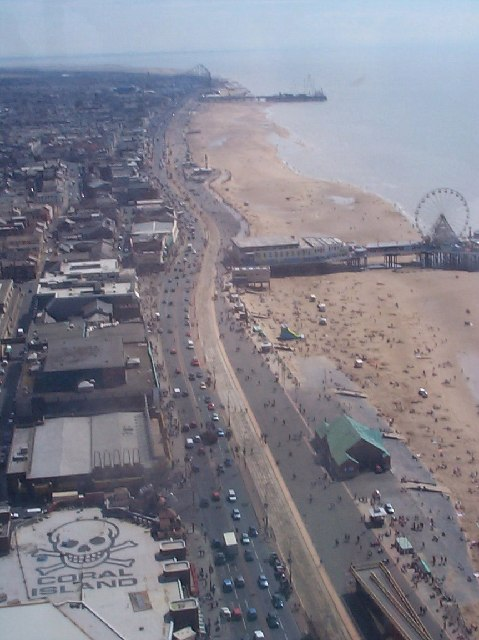
View from the top of the tower in August 2001

In 1894, the tower had a flagstaff above an ornamental crown, with both an enclosed and an open‑air viewing area. In the early 1900s electrical light beacons and searchlights were displayed during Blackpool Illuminations light festival (September-January). During World War II, public access was curtailed, and the top was an observation post.

The top of the tower is currently known as the Blackpool Tower Top. At a height of 380 feet (120 m), the tower is the highest observation deck in North West England. It was previously known as the Blackpool Tower Eye from September 2011 until early 2026, after then-new operators Merlin Entertainments incorporated the tower into its range of "Eye" branded attractions. Upon Blackpool Tourism Ltd taking over, it reverted to the previous name Tower Top. The tower observation deck contains a bar as well as the Skywalk glass floor.. In total, there are four levels at the top of the Tower accessible to visitors.

Entry to the Tower Top is preceded by a 4D cinema with a Blackpool-themed film created in 2011, which follows a young boy exploring Blackpool. The film was created by Sharp Cookies, with the 4D effects supplied by Kraftwerk Living Technologies.

=== Tower Ballroom ===
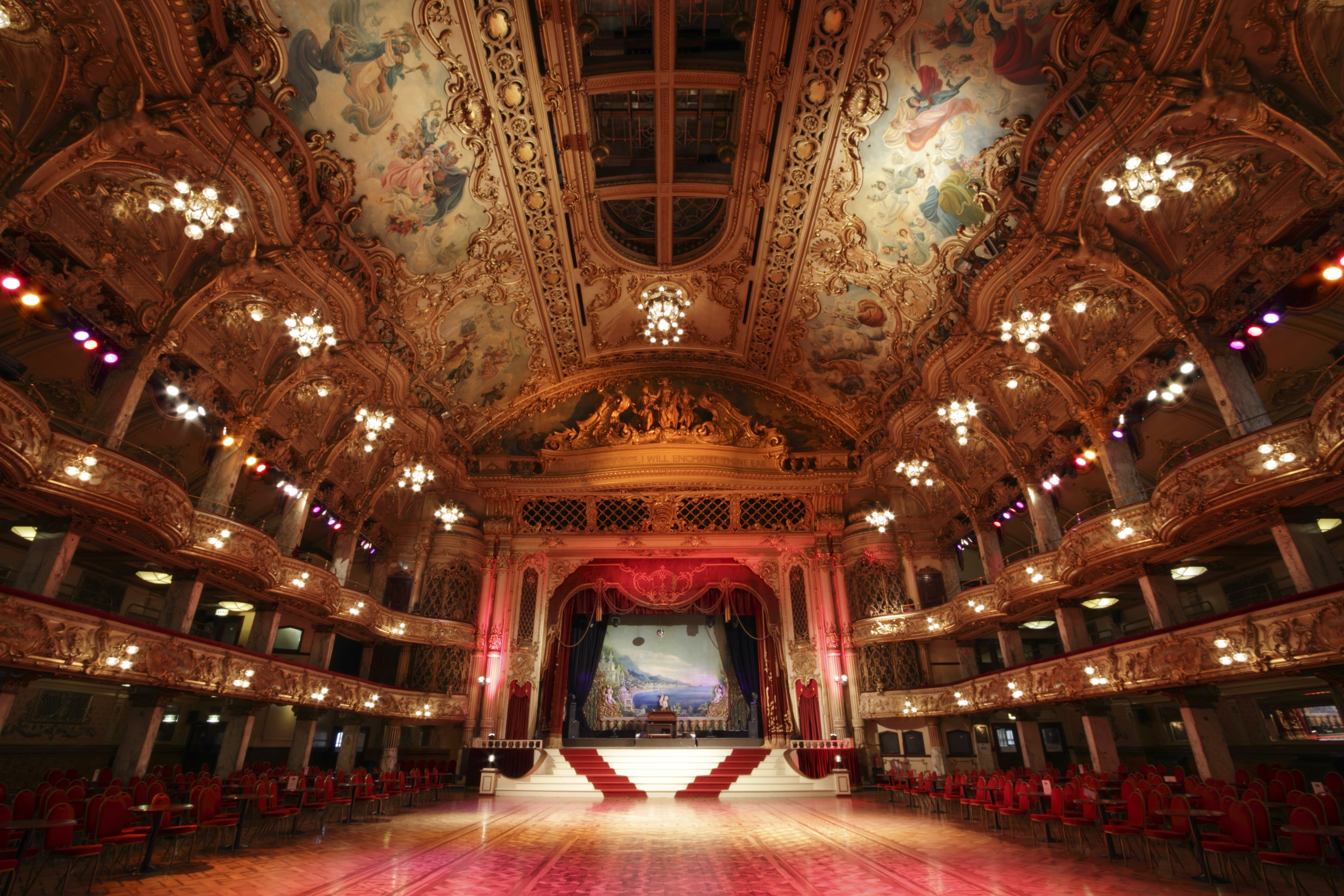
View of the whole of the dance floor in the Tower Ballroom

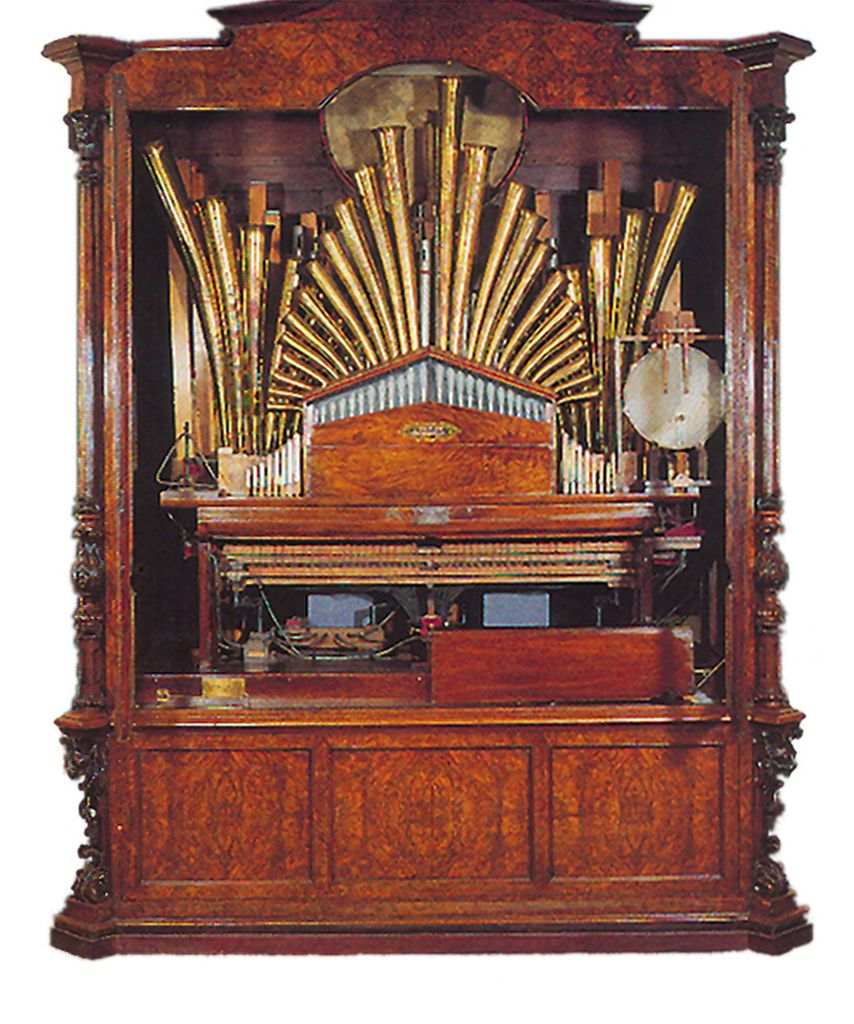
The Orchestrion

The original ballroom, the Tower Pavilion, opened in August 1894. It was smaller than the present ballroom, and occupied the front of the tower complex. The Tower Ballroom was built between 1897 and 1898 to the designs of Frank Matcham, who also designed Blackpool Grand Theatre, and it opened in 1899. It was commissioned by the Tower company in response to the opening of the Empress Ballroom in the Winter Gardens. The sprung ballroom floor is 120 ft × 102 ft (37 m × 31 m) and is made up of 30,602 blocks of mahogany, oak and walnut. Above the stage is the inscription "Bid me discourse, I will enchant thine ear", from the poem Venus and Adonis by William Shakespeare. Each crystal chandelier in the ballroom can be lowered to the floor to be cleaned, which takes over a week.

From 1930 until his retirement in 1970, the resident organist was Reginald Dixon, known affectionately worldwide as "Mr. Blackpool". The first Wurlitzer organ was installed in 1929, but it was replaced in 1935 by one designed by Dixon. Ernest Broadbent took over as resident organist in 1970, retiring due to ill-health in 1977. The current resident organist is Phil Kelsall who has been playing the organ at the Tower since 1975, when he started in the circus. Kelsall became resident in the ballroom in 1977, and he was awarded an MBE like Dixon in 2010 for services to music.

The ballroom was damaged by fire in December 1956; the dance floor was destroyed, along with the restaurant underneath the ballroom. Restoration took two years and cost £500,000, with many of the former designers and builders coming out of retirement to assist; the restaurant then became the Tower Lounge.

The BBC series Come Dancing was televised from the Tower Ballroom for many years; it has also hosted editions of Strictly Come Dancing, including the grand finals of the second and ninth series, on 11 December 2004 and 17 December 2011 respectively.

The Blackpool Junior Dance Festival ("Open to the World") has been held each year in the ballroom since 1964. Also, the World Modern Jive Championships are held annually.

Dancing was not originally allowed on Sundays; instead, sacred music was played. The ballroom also originally had very strict rules, including:

- "Gentlemen may not dance unless with a Lady" and
- "Disorderly conduct means immediate expulsion".

The ballroom has had a number of resident dance bands including Bertini and his band, and Charlie Barlow. Other smaller dance bands have also appeared as residents, including the Eric Delaney Band and the Mike James Band.

Under the management of Leisure Parcs, and the direction of bandleader Greg Francis, the Blackpool Tower Big Band was reformed in 2001 after an absence of 25 years. The New Squadronaires, the Memphis Belle Swing Orchestra and the Glenn Miller Tribute Orchestra also performed. Themed nights were also introduced along with the sixteen-piece orchestra, with resident singers including Tony Benedict, Lynn Kennedy, Robert Young and Mark Porter. The Empress Orchestra became resident in the ballroom in 2005, alongside the specially created and smaller Empress Dance Band.

The Tower's orchestrion is now in the collection of Thinktank, Birmingham Science Museum. The ballroom, together with the Tower, Circus and Roof Garden, were designated a Grade I listed building in 1973.

=== Tower Circus ===
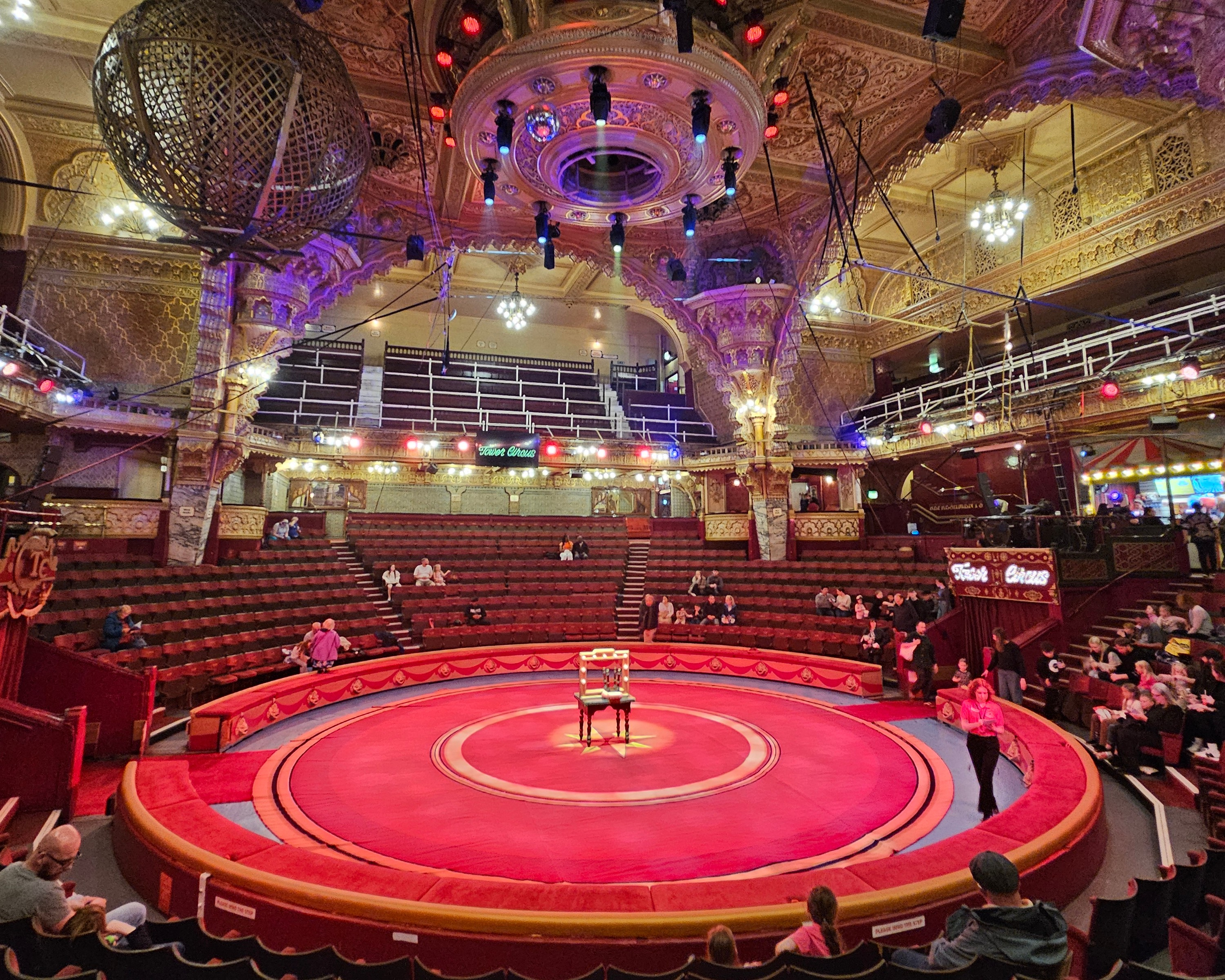
The Blackpool Tower Circus arena pictured in May 2025

The Tower Circus is positioned at the base of the tower, between its four legs. The circus first opened to the public on 14 May 1894, when admission was from 6d, and has not missed a season since.

The present interior was designed by Frank Matcham and was completed in 1900.

The circus ring can be lowered into a pool of water and holds 42,000 imperial gallons (190,000 L) at a depth of up to 4 ft 6 in (1.37 m), which allows for Grand Finales with Dancing Fountains. The Tower Circus is one of four left in the world that can do this.

The clown Charlie Cairoli appeared at the tower for 39 years. Well-known British ringmaster Norman Barrett worked the ring for 25 years, while Henry Lytton Jr. was Ringmaster here from 1954 to 1965. The current resident clowns are Mooky the Clown and his brother Mr Boo.

Animals appeared in the circus until 1990. It was planned to close the circus at the end of the 1990 season and replace it with an animatronic attraction. Public opinion and the fact the animatronics were not ready meant that the circus continued. Since 1992, the circus has been produced and directed by the Endresz family.

=== The Blackpool Tower Dungeon ===
The Blackpool Tower Dungeon is an attraction franchised from Merlin Entertainments. Opened in 2011, it incorporates elements of history with fear, and shows based on gallows humour. It also features "Drop Dead", a 26 ft (7.9 m) drop tower that simulates being executed by hanging. As an addition to the Dungeon brand Merlin introduced the first ever Dungeon themed Escape Room in 2017.

=== Dino Mini Golf ===
Merlin Entertainments launched Dino Mini Golf, an indoor crazy golf course with "9 holes of prehistoric fun", in March 2018. It has been described by Aaron Edgar, the Blackpool Tower Operations manager, as "65 million years in the making".

=== The Fifth Floor ===
The Fifth Floor is an events space located in the space that once held Jungle Jim's. It features a stage area and a bar. It opened in September 2019 alongside a VR roller coaster ride and a circus themed arcade.

== Notable former attractions ==
=== Menagerie and aquarium ===
William Cocker's Aquarium, Aviary and Menagerie had existed on the site since 1873. It was kept open to earn revenue while the Tower building went up around it, and then became one of the Tower's major attractions. The aquarium was modelled on the limestone caverns in Derbyshire. It housed 57 different species of fresh water and salt water fish, and the largest tank held 32,000 litres (7,000 imp gal; 8,500 US gal) of salt water. The menagerie and aviary were regarded as one of the finest collections in the country, and included lions, tigers, and polar bears.

The menagerie continued until 1973, when it was closed following the opening of Blackpool Zoo near Stanley Park. The aquarium closed in 2010, following the Towers' management contract being awarded to Merlin Entertainments, which also ran the nearby Sea Life Centre, and was replaced by The Blackpool Dungeons attraction.

=== Jungle Jim's Towering Adventureland ===
Jungle Jim's was a large indoor children's adventure playground situated within the Tower. It originally opened in 1977 in the space formerly occupied by the roof-top gardens and Menagerie. It was refurbished in 2008 into a £3 million interactive play scheme, based on a notional lost city – covering over 2,500 square metres (27,000 sq ft). Children could tackle a series of adventures in search of hidden treasure. It closed in 2019 and was replaced with The Fifth Floor.

=== Dawn of Time ===
The Dawn of Time was a dark ride which opened in May 1992. It featured animatronic dinosaurs and audio narration played through speakers in the ride cars. It cost £2 million and was designed by Scenesetters Animation with animation by VP Production.

The tracked ride system was removed in 2007, and the attraction was renamed to the Jurassic Walk and instead had guests walk past the dinosaurs. By this time, it also featured a 3D cinema. The attraction closed in 2011 upon Merlin's refurbishment of the Tower.

=== Other former attractions ===
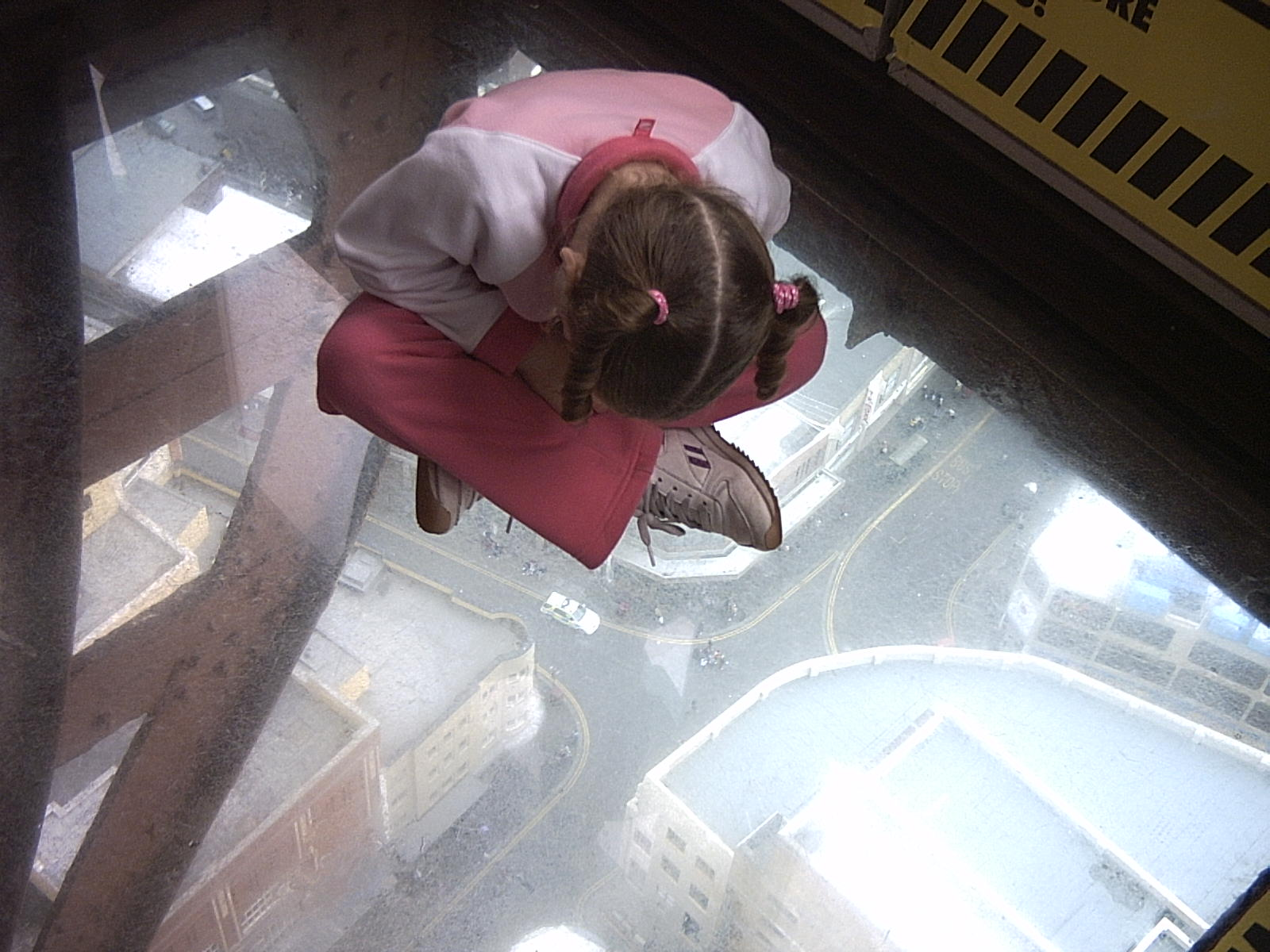
Blackpool Tower's previous Walk of Faith glass floor

- The Tower Lounge Bar was a large pub with a capacity of 1,700, but staff usually limited occupancy to 1,400 for a more relaxed atmosphere. It closed down in 2014, and has since reopened as a Harry Ramsden's fish and chip restaurant.
- The Walk of Faith was a small section of glass floor on the Tower observation deck which allowed guests to walk across it. It was inaugurated in 1998, and was replaced and superseded in 2011 by the much larger Skywalk.

== Maintenance ==
Painting the Tower structure takes seven years to complete, and the workers who maintain the structure are known as "Stick Men". There are 563 steps from the roof of the Tower building to the top of the Tower, which the maintenance teams use for the structure's upkeep. If the wind speed exceeds 45 mph (72 km/h), the top of the Tower is closed as a safety precaution; if the wind reaches 70 miles per hour (110 km/h) the tower top sways by an inch. 5 miles (8 km) of cables are used to feed the 10,000 light bulbs which are used to illuminate the Tower. The bulbs have since been replaced with 25,000 eco-friendly LED lights. In April 2002, the Tower maintenance team was featured in the BBC One programme Britain's Toughest Jobs.

== Popular culture ==
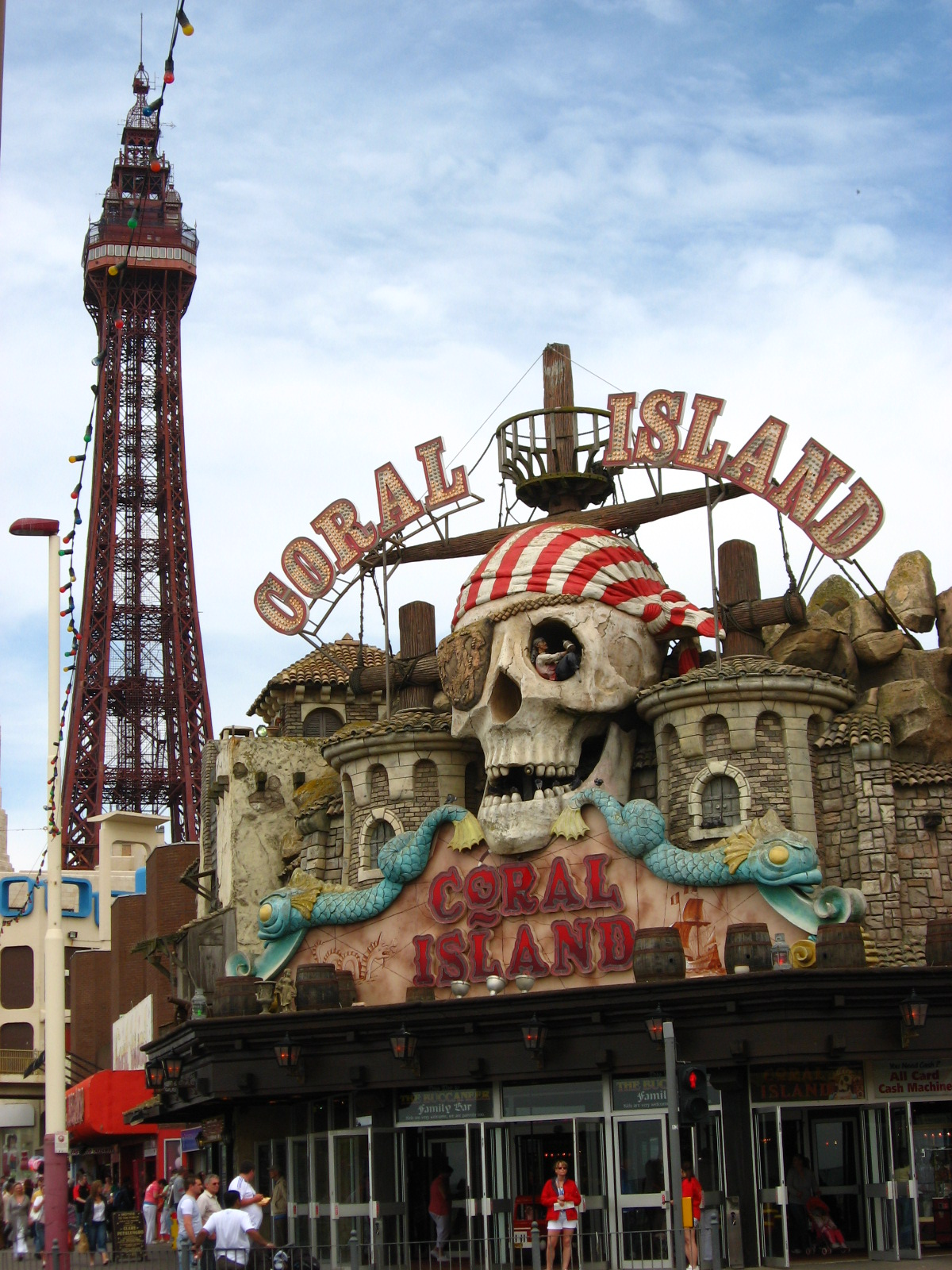
Blackpool Tower and Coral Island

- Blackpool Tower is referred to several times in the humorous monologues written by Marriott Edgar, as performed by Stanley Holloway and others:
  - In Three Ha'pence a Foot (1932), Sam Oglethwaite escapes the consequences of declining a bargain with Noah by standing on the top of Blackpool Tower, up to his neck in floodwater, finally exclaiming "The sky's took a turn since this morning: I think it'll brighten up yet."
  - In The Lion and Albert (1932) and The Return of Albert (1934), Albert Ramsbottom is swallowed whole, then eventually disgorged, by a lion called "Wallace". The incident takes place in the Blackpool Tower Menagerie, which did indeed have lions.
- Artists who have performed at the Tower include Arthur Askey, Duke Ellington, Paderewski, Dame Clara Butt, Cleo Laine, Peter Dawson, and the band Busted.
- Comedian Peter Kay performed shows in the Circus Arena on 10 and 11 April 2000; these were later released on DVD as Live at the Top of the Tower.
- The film Dick Barton Strikes Back (1947) featured a fight scene on the tower.
- The film Forbidden (1949) features the tower in a climactic scene.
- The song "Up the 'Pool" from Jethro Tull's 1972 album Living in the Past briefly mentions the tower. ("The iron tower smiles down upon the silver sea...")
- The film Funny Bones (1995) features the tower in several key scenes.
- In April 2007, punk rock band Revisit performed on the Walk of Faith at the top of the tower.
- Tim Burton's 2016 film Miss Peregrine's Home for Peculiar Children has its climax and last scenes surrounding Blackpool's Tower.
- The Killers filmed the music video for their 2012 song "Here with Me" in Blackpool. The music video starred Winona Ryder and Craig Roberts, and included various scenes in Blackpool Pleasure Beach, and Ryder and Roberts dancing in the Tower Ballroom whilst the band perform on stage.

== Visual reporting point ==
Known as "the tall tower", the tower is a visual reporting point (VRP) for general aviation aircraft in the local Blackpool airspace.

== See also ==
- List of tallest structures built before the 20th century
- List of works by Maxwell and Tuke
- List of towers
- New Brighton Tower
- Reginald Dixon
- Horace Finch
- Theatre organ
- Wade Dooley, local rugby union player capped 55 times for England and nicknamed "Blackpool Tower"
- Wurlitzers in the United Kingdom
