= Mossom =

Mossom is a surname. Notable people with the surname include:

- Audrey Mossom (1920–2009), English teen celebrity and dancer
- Eland Mossom (c. 1709–1774), Irish lawyer and politician
- Robert Mossom (bishop) (1617–1679), Bishop of Derry
- Robert Mossom (priest), Dean of Ossory in the 18th century
