= Eland Mossom =

Irish lawyer and politician (c. 1709 – 1774)

Eland Mossom Esq.

Member of parliament for St Canice
- In office 1759–1774
- Preceded by: Viscount Moore
- Succeeded by: Thomas Radcliffe

Personal details
- Born: c.1709 Mount Eland, County Kilkenny, Ireland
- Died: 29 April 1774 County Kilkenny, Ireland
- Spouse: Hannah Birch
- Children: Eland, Rebecca, Margaret, and Elizabeth.

Eland Mossom, Esq. M.P. (c. 1709 – 29 April 1774) was a lawyer, recorder of the City of Kilkenny, and representative in the Parliament of Ireland for the Borough of St Canice in Irishtown. He was the eldest son of Dean of Kilkenny Robert Mossom. He resided at Mount Eland, near Ballyraggett.

The Great Flood of 1763 destroyed Green's Bridge in his borough, rebuilt in 1766 it retains a stone plaque which says "Eland Mossom MP for this Borough 1776".

== Career ==
Mossom entered Trinity College in 1724. He was called to the Bar in England by The Honorable Society of the Middle Temple on 4 February 1743 and to the Bar in Ireland on 4 April 1745.

He was chosen recorder of the city of Kilkenny in 1750. He served as Member of parliament for the Borough of St Canice in Irishtown from 1759 till his death on 29 April 1774.

== Background ==
The family of Mossom, Massam, or Masham, was anciently seated in the north parts of England, where they were of good account. The Mossoms of Mount Eland, County Kilkenny, were originally of Yorkshire and Lincolnshire. The Masham Baronetcy, of High Lever in the County of Essex, was created on 20 December 1621 by James I as a Baronetage of England for William Masham. Courtier Samuel Masham was raised to the peerage in 1711-2, by the title of Baron Masham of Otes, in County Essex. In 1723 he also succeeded as fourth Baronet of High Lever. Around the time of Henry VI of England one branch became seated at Badwell Ash in Suffolk.

The first Mossom to go to Ireland, a native of Lincolnshire, was the Rt Rev. Robert Mossom who became the Bishop of Derry from 1666 to 1679. He was a near relation of Sir Thomas Grlemham. Bishop Mossom had a son Robert Mossom, who became Master in the Court of Chancery, in Ireland, in 1662. He married Elizabeth, the daughter of Reresby, and had three children, including Robert (the father of Eland Mossom), Mittley, and Elizabeth. He was buried in St. Catherine's Church, Dublin.

Mossom's father the Right Reverend Robert Mossom (c. 1666–8 February 1747) was promoted to the Deanery of Ossory on 25 February 1701. On 10 April 1730 he was presented by the Crown to the Rectory of Clonenagh. He was a great friend of Dean Swift. On 15 April 1703, he married Rebecca, the daughter and co-heir of Robert Mason, Esq. and had two children: Eland Mossom and Thomas Mossom (c. 1720–1777), of Grange Macombe, County Kilkenny, also a barrister-at-law.

Dean Mossom died in 1747 and was buried in his own vault in St. Canice Cathedral, Kilkenny. In accordance with a testamentary request from Eland Mossom's brother Thomas, a monument was erected to him and his father in the cathedral. This was done by Lady Wheeler-Cuffe the executor of his will.

== Family ==
Mossom married Hannah Birch, the daughter of John Birch Esq. She was the widow of Charles Heydock, Esq. of Kilcreene, near Kilkenny. They had four children: Eland, Rebecca, Margaret, and Elizabeth. Margaret married a Lieutenant Colonel Birch, of Birchfield, and Elizabeth died unmarried. Eland is buried in the family vault, in St. Canice's Cathedral, Kilkenny.

Mossom's son, Colonel Eland Mossom M.P. (c. 1749), was a magistrate for County Kilkenny, and was elected in 1777 to serve in Parliament for Kilkenny City. He served in the 4th Regiment of Dragoons and was colonel of the Kilkenny Rangers. He first married Hannah-Maria, the daughter of Sir William Barker, 3rd Baronet of the Barker baronets of Bocking Hall and later married Jane Hewetson, daughter and heir of Christopher Hewetson, Esq., of Thomastown, (grandson of Colonel Christopher Hewetson), by Sarah, sister (or daughter) of Colonel John Flood, of Flood Hall, County Kilkenny.

Rebecca Mossom, his eldest daughter, married Sir Richard Wheeler-Cuffe of Lyrath, on 10 December 1768. Rebecca was a grandmother of Sir Charles Frederick Wheeler-Cuffe, captain of the 66th Regiment. Rebecca's son Sir Jonah D. Wheeler Cuffe, Bart., Baronet of Leyrath, married the daughter of Browne, Esq, and granddaughter of Joseph Bourke, 3rd Earl of Mayo.

Parliament of Ireland
Preceded by Edmond Malone; Robert Sibthorpe	Member of Parliament for St Canice; 1759–1774; With: Richard Dawson 1727–1761; Thomas Waite 1761–1768; Lord Frederick Campbell 1768–1776	Succeeded by Thomas Radcliffe; Lord Frederick Campbell
