= Robert Mossom =

Robert Mossom may refer to:

- Robert Mossom (bishop) (1617–1679), bishop of Derry
- Robert Mossom (priest), his grandson, professor of divinity at Trinity College and dean of Ossory
