= Robert Watts (priest) =

Irish priest

Robert Watts was an Anglican priest in Ireland in the mid Eighteenth century: he was Dean of Ferns from 1740 until 1747 and Dean of Kilkenny in the Diocese of Ossory from 1747 until 1753.

== Notes ==
Church of Ireland titles
Preceded by Joseph Story	Dean of Ferns; 1740–1747	Succeeded by John Alcock
Preceded by Robert Mossom	Dean of Ossory; 1747–1753	Succeeded by John Lewis
