= Daniel Neyland =

Irish Anglican priest (1618–1688)

Daniel Neyland (1618–1688) was an Irish Anglican priest in the 17th century.

Neyland was born in County Clare and educated at Trinity College, Dublin. Neyland was Prebendary of St Michan's in Christ Church Cathedral, Dublin from 1661 until his death; Dean of Elphin from 1664 to 1665; and Dean of Ossory from 1666 until his death.
