= List of people who have switched on the Blackpool Illuminations =

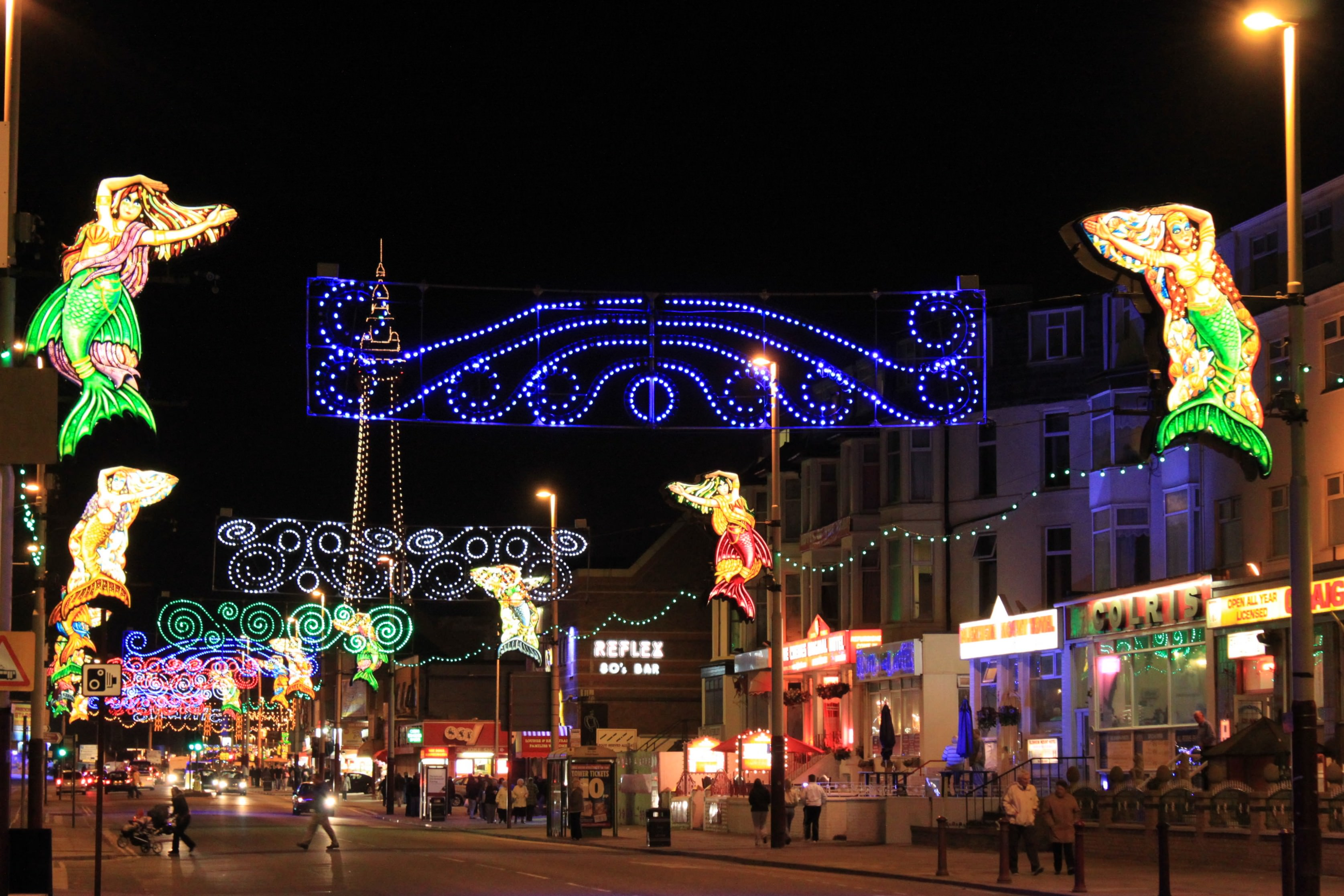
The Blackpool Illuminations In 2009 with mermaids hanging each side of the lamp posts with decorative lights hanging in between them whilst the Blackpool Tower in the background is lit up gold

The Blackpool Illuminations is an annual lights festival with over one million light bulbs. Founded in 1879 and held each autumn from August until November they are on for 66 nights a year. In 1934, the town began a tradition of marking the start of the festival by hosting a public figure to perform the inaugural switch-on of the lights. For the first public ceremony, the honor was performed by Lord Derby. In subsequent years, hosts have predominantly been drawn from the world of entertainment with occasional appearances by sportspeople and political figures. Unusual hosts have included a Canberra bomber aircraft in 1969 and racehorse Red Rum in 1977.

== List of switch on hosts ==
Year	
1934	Lord Derby
1935	Audrey Mosson (Railway Queen of Great Britain)
1936	Sir Josiah Stamp
1937	Prince George, Duke of Kent
1938	Councillor Mabel A. Quayle (Mayoress of Blackpool; first woman councillor)
1939–1948	Cancelled due to World War II
1949	Anna Neagle
1950	Wilfred Pickles
1951	Stanley Matthews
1952	Valerie Hobson
1953	George Formby
1954	Gilbert Harding
1955	Yakov Malik (Soviet Ambassador)
1956	Reginald Dixon
1957	John H. Whitney (American Ambassador)
1958	A. E. "Matty" Matthews
1959	Jayne Mansfield
1960	Janet Munro
1961	Violet Carson
1962	Shirley Anne Field
1963	Cliff Michelmore
1964	Gracie Fields
1965	David Tomlinson
1966	Ken Dodd
1967	Horace King
1968	Matt Busby
1969	Canberra Bomber
1970	Tony Blackburn
1971	The cast of Dad's Army
1972	Danny La Rue
1973	Gordon Banks
1974	Wendy Craig
1975	Cast of Doctor Who: Tom Baker (in costume as The Doctor), Elisabeth Sladen and Ian Marter
1976	Carol Jean Grant (Miss United Kingdom)
1977	Red Rum
1978	Terry Wogan
1979	Kermit the Frog and The Muppets
1980	Cannon and Ball
1981	Earl & Countess Spencer
1982	Rear Admiral Sandy Woodward
1983	Cast of Coronation Street, switched on by Doris Speed
1984	Johannes Rau (Prime Minister of North Rhine-Westphalia) and David Waddington,(Minister of State, the Home Office)
1985	Joanna Lumley, BBC Children in Need, and Audrey Mosson (50 year anniversary)
1986	Les Dawson
1987	Frank Bough, Anne Gregg and Kathy Tayler, all from the BBC's Holiday programme
1988	Andrew Lloyd Webber and Sarah Brightman
1989	Frank Bruno
1990	Julie Goodyear and Roy Barraclough
1991	Derek Jameson and Judith Chalmers
1992	Lisa Stansfield
1993	Status Quo
1994	Shirley Bassey
1995	Bee Gees
1996	Eternal
1997	Michael Ball
1998	Chris de Burgh
1999	Gary Barlow
2000	Westlife
2001	Steps
2002	Ronan Keating
2003	Blue
2004	Geri Halliwell
2005	Chris Evans
2006	Dale Winton
2007	David Tennant
2008	The Stig with Jeremy Clarkson and Richard Hammond from BBC Top Gear
2009	Alan Carr
2010	Robbie Williams
2011	Keith Lemon
2012	6 of Team GB's London 2012 medalists. (Beth Tweddle, Greg Rutherford, Karina Bryant, Luke Campbell, Max Whitlock and Sophie Hosking)
2013	Jonathan Ross
2014	Peter Kay
2015	Tim Burton
2016	Barbara Windsor
2017	Star Trek: Discovery (Jason Isaacs) and Diversity
2018	Alfie Boe
2019	Lucy Fallon
2020	A group of Britain's Coronavirus NHS Heroes
2021	Strictly Come Dancing judge Shirley Ballas
2022	Laurence Llewelyn-Bowen (replacement for Johnny Vegas)
2023	Sophie Ellis-Bextor
2024	Mel B (Scary Spice)
2025	Olly Murs
2026	Paddy McGuinness
