= Joseph Teate =

Irish Anglican priest

Joseph Teate was an Anglican priest in Ireland during the seventeenth century.

Teate was educated at Trinity College, Dublin. He was the Archdeacon of Ossory from 1661 to 1668; and Dean of Ossory from 1668 to 1671.
