= Lord Frederick Campbell =

British politician

Lord Frederick Campbell MP PC FRS
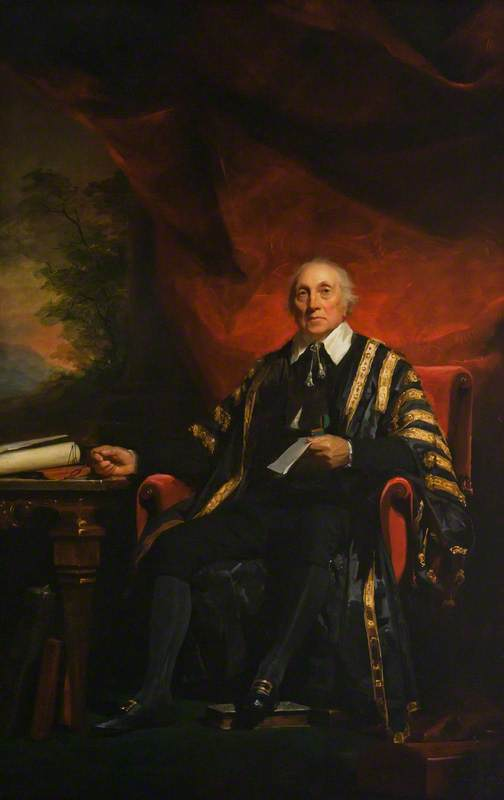
- Portrait of Campbell by Henry Raeburn, c. 1810.

Rector of the University of Glasgow
- In office 1772–1773
- Preceded by: Robert Ord
- Succeeded by: The Lord Cathcart

Lord Clerk Register
- In office 1768–1816
- Preceded by: Sir Gilbert Elliot, 2nd Baronet
- Succeeded by: Archibald Colquhoun

Chief Secretary for Ireland
- In office 1767–1768
- Preceded by: Theophilus Jones
- Succeeded by: Sir George Macartney

Keeper of the Privy Seal of Scotland
- In office 1765
- Preceded by: James Stuart-Mackenzie
- Succeeded by: The Earl of Breadalbane and Holland

Member of Parliament (House of Commons of the United Kingdom)
- In office 1789–1799
- Monarch: George III
- Preceded by: Adam Livingston
- Succeeded by: Lord John Campbell
- Constituency: Argyllshire
- In office 1780–1781
- Monarch: George III
- Preceded by: Sir Archibald Edmonstone, Bt
- Succeeded by: George Elphinstone
- Constituency: Dunbartonshire
- In office 1761–1780
- Monarch: George III
- Preceded by: Marquess of Lorne
- Succeeded by: John Craufurd
- Constituency: Glasgow Burghs

Member of Parliament (Irish House of Commons)
- In office 1768–1776 Serving with Eland Mossom; Thomas Radcliffe
- Monarch: George III
- Preceded by: Thomas Radcliffe
- Succeeded by: John Hamilton
- Constituency: St Canice
- In office 1767–1768 Serving with Thomas Eyre
- Monarch: George III
- Preceded by: Alexander McAuley; Thomas Eyre
- Succeeded by: James Agar; Thomas Maunsell
- Constituency: Thomastown

Personal details
- Born: 20 June 1729
- Died: 8 June 1816 (aged 86) Queen Street, Mayfair, London, United Kingdom
- Spouse: Mary Meredith (m. 1769; died 1807)
- Parents: John Campbell, 4th Duke of Argyll (father); Mary Drummond Bellenden (mother)
- Education: Westminster School; Christ Church, Oxford

Lord Frederick Campbell MP PC FRS (20 June 1729 – 8 June 1816) was a British politician. He was Lord Clerk Register of Scotland, 1768–1816; Member of Parliament (MP) for Glasgow Burghs (1761–1780) and for Argyllshire (1780–1799).

== Biography ==
Frederick Campbell was the third son of John Campbell, 4th Duke of Argyll, and his wife, Mary, daughter of John Bellenden, 2nd Lord Bellenden. Lord Frederick was educated at Westminster School (1743-6) and Christ Church, Oxford (1747) before entering Middle Temple (1751) and being called to the Bar in 1754.

Although his father had intended him for the parliamentary seat of Ayr Burghs, he instead succeeded his brother Lord Lorne to the seat of Glasgow Burghs in 1761.

In 1765, being very intimate with Mr. Grenville, Lord Frederick was active in the arrangements for transferring the prerogatives and rights of the Duke of Atholl in the Isle of Man (then a nest of smugglers), to the Crown, and in fixing the compensation to be given; but he felt and complained that the compensation was inadequate.

In the same year (1765) Lord Frederick was for a few months Keeper of the Privy Seal of Scotland but resigned in July following the dismissal of the Grenville administration and was succeeded in the office by Lord Breadalbane. Lord Frederick was sworn of the privy council 29 May 1765, made Lord Clerk Register for Scotland in 1768, and confirmed in that office for life in 1777. In 1774 Lord Frederick had laid the foundation-stone for a register house at Edinburgh, and procured a permanent establishment for keeping the records, and received the thanks of the court of session. He was elected Rector of Glasgow University for 1772–73.

Lord Frederick sat in the Irish House of Commons for Thomastown from 1767 to 1768 and for St Canice from 1768 and 1776.

In 1778 he was appointed colonel of the Western regiment of Fencible Men (Argyle Fencibles). In 1786 a member of the board of control for India, and from 1787 to 1793 the joint Vice-Treasurer of Ireland under George, Viscount Townshend, the Lord-lieutenant. As a member of parliament he seems to have been reticent; but it was on his motion in 1796 that Henry Addington was elected speaker of the Great British Parliament. He was treasurer of the Middle Temple in 1803. He died 8 June 1816 in Queen Street, Mayfair.

== Family ==
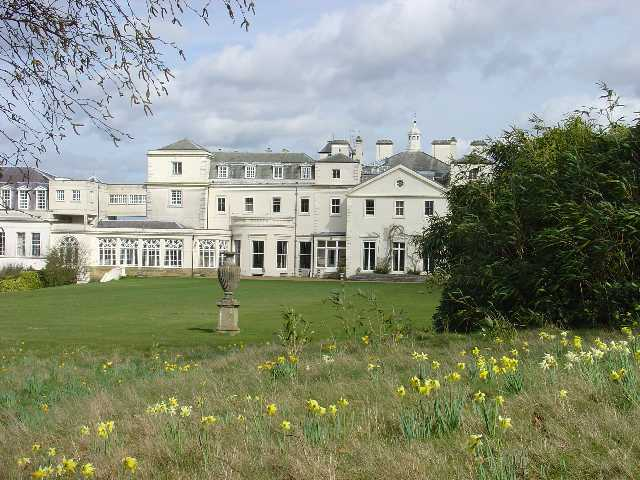
Combe Bank – now a school

Lord Frederick was married, 28 March 1769, to Mary, youngest daughter of Mr. Amos Meredith of Henbury, Cheshire, sister of Sir William Meredith, 3rd Baronet, and widow of the infamous Laurence Shirley, 4th Earl Ferrers. She was burnt to death in a fire at their house, Combe Bank, Kent, in 1807. They had two daughters, one of whom, Mary, married Captain Donald Campbell of Barbreck. In 1752 Horace Walpole reported that Campbell was the love interest (aged 22) of society hostess Viscountess Etheldreda Townshend (aged 44).

On 7 November 1793 he was made as a Fellow of the Royal Society. (Note: List of fellows of the Royal Society A, B, C#C)

Lord Frederick had inherited Combe Bank (or Coombe Bank), near Sevenoaks, Kent, on the death of his father in 1770. His daughter sold the estate to William Manning, MP after his death.

== Legacy ==
A Canadian school was named after him.

== Notes ==
Parliament of Great Britain
Preceded by Marquess of Lorne	Member of Parliament for Glasgow Burghs; 1761–1780	Succeeded by John Craufurd
Preceded by Sir Archibald Edmonstone, Bt	Member of Parliament for Dunbartonshire; 1780–1781	Succeeded by George Elphinstone
Preceded by Adam Livingston	Member of Parliament for Argyllshire; 1789–1799	Succeeded by Lord John Campbell
Parliament of Ireland
Preceded by Alexander McAuley; Thomas Eyre	Member of Parliament for Thomastown; 1767–1768; With: Thomas Eyre	Succeeded by James Agar; Thomas Maunsell
Preceded by Eland Mossom; Thomas Waite	Member of Parliament for St Canice; 1768–1776; With: Eland Mossom 1768–1774; Thomas Radcliffe 1774–1776	Succeeded by John Monck Mason; John William Hamilton
Political offices
Preceded by James Stuart-Mackenzie	Keeper of the Privy Seal of Scotland; 1765	Succeeded by The Earl of Breadalbane and Holland
Preceded by Theophilus Jones	Chief Secretary for Ireland; 1767–1768	Succeeded by Sir George Macartney
Preceded by The Earl of Morton	Lord Clerk Register; 1768–1816	Succeeded by Archibald Colquhoun
Preceded by Baron Walsingham; Earl of Mount Edgcumbe	Vice-Treasurer of Ireland; 1787–1793; With: Earl of Mount Edgcumbe	Succeeded by
Academic offices
Preceded by Robert Ord	Rector of the University of Glasgow; 1772–1773	Succeeded by The Lord Cathcart
