= Thomas Radcliffe (Irish politician) =

Irish politician (1715–1776)

Thomas Radcliffe (1715 – 24 January 1776) was an Irish politician.

He was the Member of Parliament for St Canice in the Irish House of Commons between 1774 and his death in 1776.

Parliament of Ireland
Preceded by Eland Mossom; Lord Frederick Campbell	Member of Parliament for St Canice; 1774–1776; With: Lord Frederick Campbell	Succeeded by John Monck Mason; John Hamilton
