= Norman Lynas =

Irish Anglican dean (born 1955)

Norman Noel Lynas (born 1955) was Dean of Ossory from 1991 to 2010.

Lynas was educated at the University of St Andrews and ordained in 1980. After a curacy at Knockbreda he was the Incumbent at Portadown before his time as Dean; and a Canon Residentiary at Bermuda Cathedral. afterwards.
