= Charles Vignoles (priest) =

Irish dean

Charles Augustus Vignoles (b Portarlington, County Laois 25 July 1789 – d Kilkenny 18 October 1877) was a Nineteenth century Church of Ireland dean, specifically the dean of Ossory and the dean of the Chapel Royal, Dublin.

Vignoles was in the fourth generation of the Huguenot family of the name from Portarlington. In the 1830s he was resident at Cornaher House near Tyrrellspass, County Westmeath, built by his father the Rev. John Vignoles (died 1819), a former army officer, and was rector of Newtown Church. He contributed to the building of the local Christ Church (1834). His sister Elizabeth Anne Vignoles married George Grey and was mother of Sir George Grey, 11th Premier of New Zealand.

Church of Ireland titles
Preceded by Office created	Deans of the Chapel Royal, Dublin; 1831–1843	Succeeded by Hugh Usher Tighe
Preceded by Joseph Bourke	Dean of Ossory; 1843–1877	Succeeded by Thomas Hare
