= Frances Burgess =

English weaver

- Burgess in 1930
- Born: Frances Lockett; 1910; Hyde, Greater Manchester, England
- Died: 1993 (aged 82–83); Hyde
- Occupation: Weaver
- Known for: The United Kingdom's first Cotton Queen

Frances Burgess (née Lockett; 1910–1993) was an English woman and the first person to be crowned the national Cotton Queen in 1930. She held the position for one year, travelling the country to promote business and meeting high-ranking politicians. After her term, she returned to her job as a weaver in a cotton mill.

== Biography ==
Burgess was born Frances Lockett in 1910 in Hyde, Greater Manchester. Her father was a policeman. She left school aged 14 and started work as a weaver at Newton Mill in Hyde. In 1930 she was selected to be Hyde's first Cotton Queen; later the same year she became the first national Cotton Queen and was crowned in Blackpool. On her return to Hyde, after being crowned, she was greeted by a crowd of 20,000 people.

The town was decorated for this procession and the parade included Lockett in an open carriage, mounted police, Morris dancers, the Kingston Mill Band, Hyde Borough Brass Band, and over 300 workers from Newton Mill.

In the year after she was crowned, Lockett undertook a tour attending events to boost the reputation of the cotton industry. As part of this she met politicians Stanley Baldwin, Ramsay MacDonald, Lloyd George and Margaret Bondfield. Lloyd George reportedly touched her dress and inquired where he could buy some of the same material it was made from for his daughter. She also travelled the country visiting department stores to encourage sales of cotton, often chaperoned by her employer's wife. Lockett recalled in later life that she knew Cotton Queen "wasn’t going to be just like a Rose Queen; you were going to be kind of an ambassador for cotton".

After her year as Cotton Queen finished, Lockett returned to Hyde and continued to work as a weaver at J & J Ashton's Mill. In 1937 she married policeman, James Burgess. They had no children.

Lockett died in 1993. She was a local celebrity until her death.

== Legacy ==
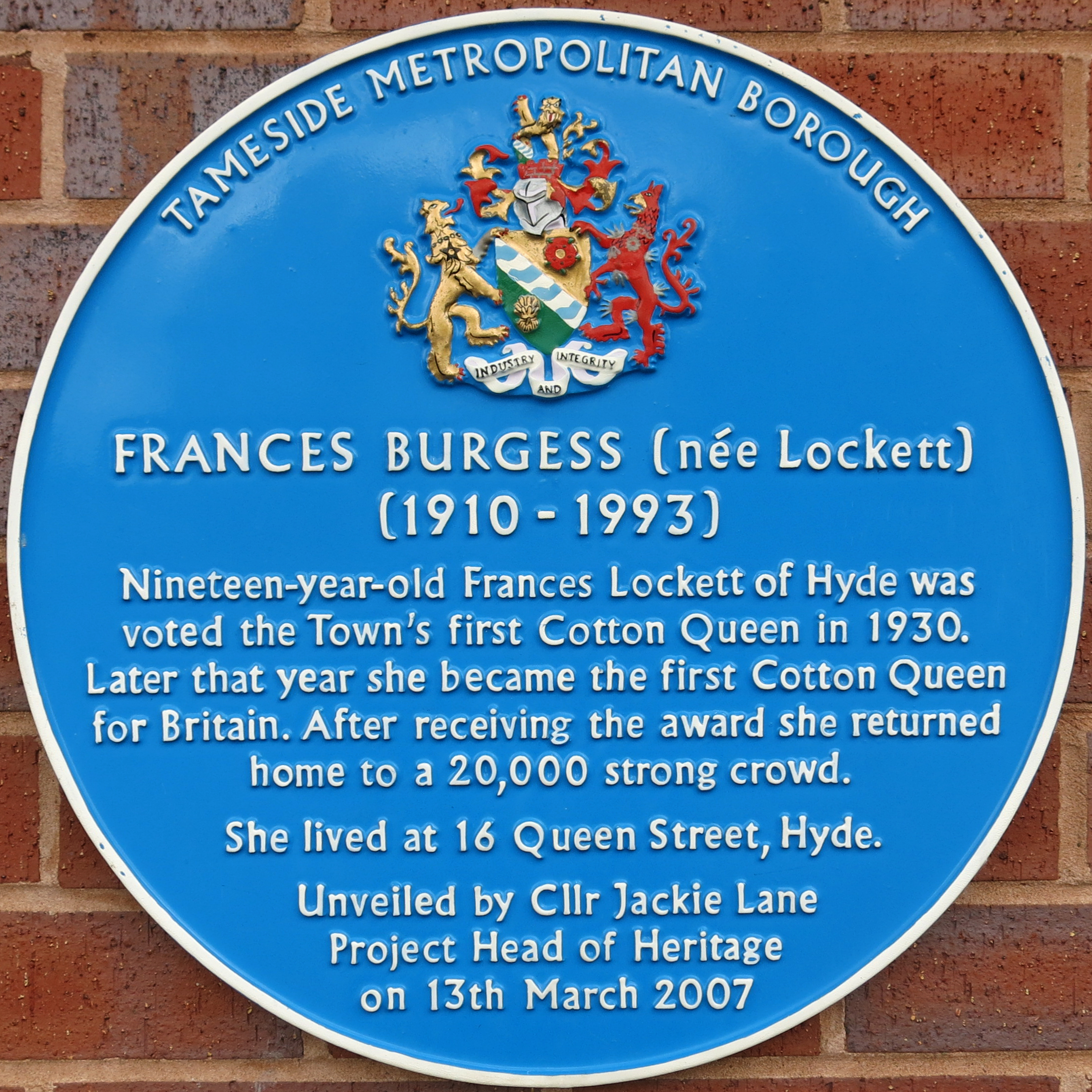
Frances Burgess (née Lockett), Cotton Queen

Lockett's success as Cotton Queen was commemorated in the popular song "Waltz of the Cotton Queen". There was also merchandise produced to mark her time as queen, including postcards and handkerchiefs made from "Queenetta" fabric.

On 13 March 2007, a blue plaque was unveiled in Hyde, dedicated to her life. Lockett's story was one of several to feature in an exhibition at Leeds Industrial Museum in 2017.
