= George Wilde (bishop) =

Irish Anglican bishop

George Wilde (9 January 1610 – 29 December 1665) was Bishop of Derry from 1661 to 1665.

Wilde was born in London, the son of Henry Wilde. He was educated at Merchant Taylors’ School (admitted 1619) and St John's College, Oxford (matriculated 1629 aged 19, fellow 1631–48, B.C.L. 1635 (incorporated at Cambridge 1635), D.C.L. 1647).

Ordained in 1636, he was Chaplain to William Laud, Archbishop of Canterbury; then Vicar of St Giles, Reading; and Rector of Biddenden. A committed Royalist, after the Restoration, Wilde was appointed to the episcopate and consecrated at St Patrick's Cathedral, Dublin on 27 January 1661. His funeral sermon was preached by Robert Mossom, his successor.

Church of Ireland titles
Preceded by John Bramhall	Bishop of Derry; 1666–1669	Succeeded by Robert Mossom
