= Adam Livingston =

18th-century Scottish soldier and politician

Adam Livingston (c. 1723 – 1795) was a Scottish soldier and politician who sat in the House of Commons from 1772 to 1780.

Livingston was the second surviving son of Sir James Livingston, 2nd Baronet, of Glentirran and Bantaskine and his wife Helen Campbell, daughter of Sir James Campbell, 2nd Baronet, of Ardkinglass, Argyll, and was baptized at Falkirk on 29 July 1722. He joined the army in the Royal Scots Fusiliers and was 2nd lieutenant in 1742, captain in 1751 and major in 1758. He served in Canada under General Wolfe and became lieutenant-colonel in 1762, retiring in 1766. When his father died in 1771 he succeeded to the Bantaskine estate.

In 1772 Livingston was returned as Member of Parliament for Argyllshire in the interest of John Campbell, 5th Duke of Argyll. Samuel Johnson met Livingston when he visited the Duke and after hearing his "vague" conversation, observed “‘a mighty misty man, the Colonel”. In 1780, the Duke required the parliamentary seat for his brother Frederick, so Livingston stood down, and did not try to enter Parliament again. In 1785 he was appointed Lord Treasurer's Remembrancer in Exchequer in Scotland. During his ownership of the Bantaskine estate the Forth and Clyde canal was built through it, and from 1790 he started selling off parts of the estate. He eventually sold Bantaskine to Sir Alexander Campbell of Ardkinglas in 1791.

Livingston died unmarried on 16 June 1795.

== Sources ==
Parliament of Great Britain
| Preceded by Robert Campbell | Member of Parliament for Argyllshire; 1772 –1780 | Succeeded by Lord Frederick Campbell |
