= Joseph Bourke =

Irish Anglican cleric

Joseph Bourke (9 January 1772 – 3 May 1843) was an Anglican priest in Ireland during the late 18th and early 19th Centuries.

The son of Joseph Bourke, 3rd Earl of Mayo, Archbishop of Tuam from 1782 to 1784, he was educated at Trinity College, Dublin. He was Dean of Ossory from 1795 until his death.
