= Brian Harvey (priest) =

Brian Harvey (1916–2005) was Dean of Ossory from 1970 to 1991.

He was educated at Trinity College, Dublin and ordained in 1941. After curacies in Dublin he was on the staff of Queen's University Belfast from 1945 to 1948. He spent the next fifteen years in India, rising to become Archdeacon of Hazaribagh. He was Canon Theologian at Belfast Cathedral from 1963 to 1970.

He retired to West Cork.
