= Queens of Industry =

Winners of industrial beauty pageants

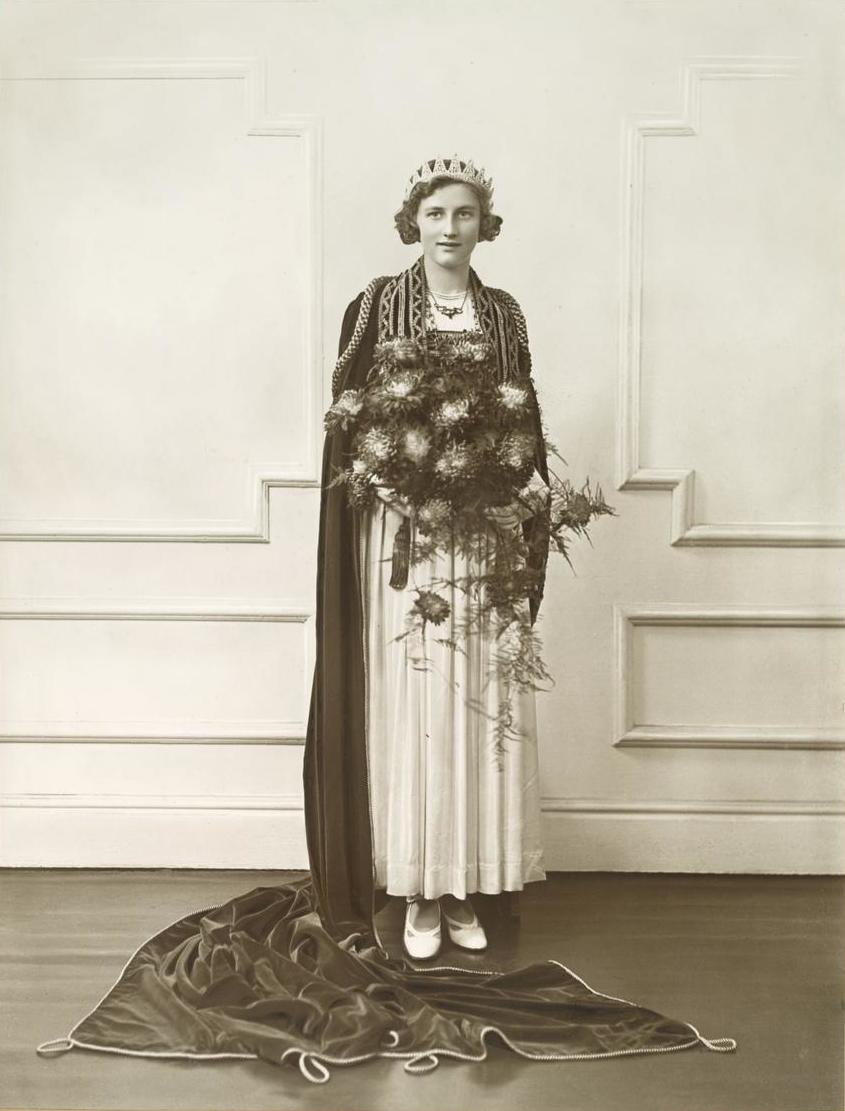
Irene Easton, Railway Queen 1936

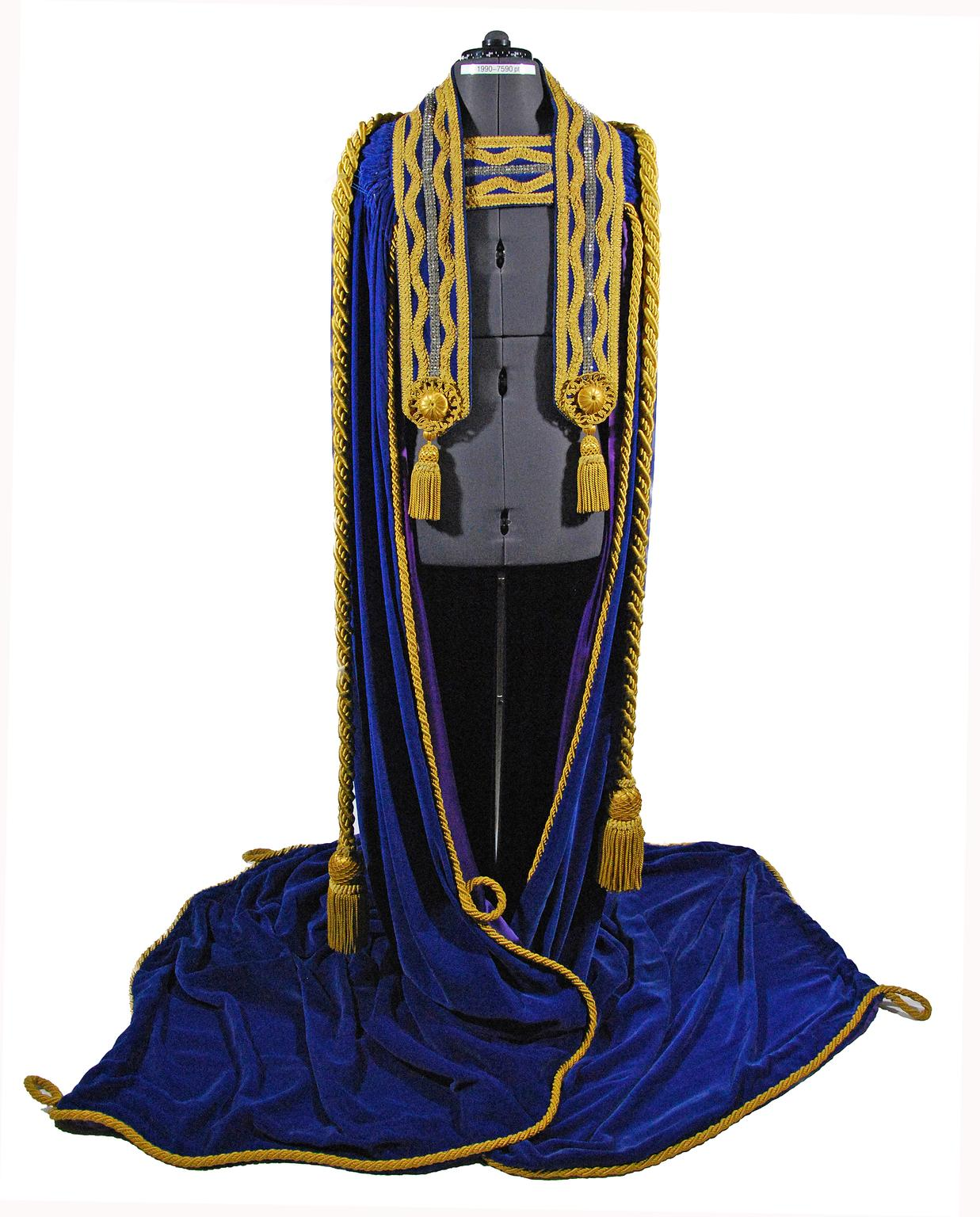
Velvet gown of Railway Queens, such as Irene Easton

Queens of Industry were women who were chosen by their industries, through local, regional and national beauty-pageant style competitions, to become the mascots or official representatives of their fields. This twentieth-century phenomenon began in 1925 when a Railway Queen was crowned to mark the centenary of the Stockton & Darlington Railway. It spread to the other major industries in Britain, first to textiles such as cotton, wool and silk, and then to other industries including coal. The practice stopped in the 1980s in Britain, but continued in other countries into the twenty-first century.

== History ==
The phenomenon began in Britain in the 1920s, inspired by the tradition of the May Queen. The first industry to embrace the idea of a 'Queen' was the railway industry. During the 1930s, a wide variety of industries embraced the idea and at one event in 1936, in Blackpool, the Queens present included: the Cotton Queen, Salt Queen, Fish Queen, Locomotive Queen, Potteries Queen, Wool Queen, and Silk Queen. There were other Queens as well, such as the Queen of the Radio, and the Queen of the English Riviera. The idea was also adopted in the US, where other industries represented included the Tobacco Queen.

For the women who became Queens, it gave many of them access to new opportunities. The winner of the pageants would often meet different political figures of the time; their aim was to help raise morale and speak publicly. The phenomenon was sometimes criticised as a public relations stunt, designed to distract workers from trade union disputes and high levels of employee dissatisfaction.

== Railway Queens ==
The first Railway Queen was crowned as part of the centenary celebrations of the Stockton & Darlington Railway in 1925. For these early queens, physical appearance was important and those chosen were often daughters of railway workers, aged 14 to 17 years old. The first queen was Helena "Ella" Wotton, the daughter of a Great Western Railway Employee.

Audrey Mosson was crowned Railway Queen in 1935, aged 15. Mosson was crowned the tenth Railway Queen in front of a crowd of 70,000 at the Railway Carnival and Pageant held at Belle Vue, Manchester. Extremely popular and originally from Blackpool, Mosson was the second celebrity ever to be invited to switch on Blackpool Illuminations. Mosson repeated the honour, 50 years later, when she appeared alongside Switch-on host Joanna Lumley in 1985.

In 1936, Mosson was invited to visit the Soviet Union and the question was raised as to whether she should visit as a schoolgirl, or as Britain's Railway Queen. The latter role was chosen and she met Stalin and Russian railway workers.

In 1928, Ena Best from Rusholme was crowned Railway Queen. During her year as the industry's representative, she travelled to Holland to visit Dutch railway workers, as well as opening Europe's longest station platform, which was created when Manchester Exchange station was linked to Manchester Victoria.

Lynnette Storr, 1970, York’s only ever Railway Queen, was the last to be crowned in Belle View Stadium, Manchester, UK.

In 1975, Brenda Tomlinson was the final Railway Queen to be crowned in a ceremony at Shildon.

=== Winners ===
- Helena "Ella" Wotton – Railway Queen (1925)
- Mabel Kitson - Railway Queen (1927)
- Ena Best – Railway Queen (1928)
- E M Brown - Railway Queen (1929)
- Lily Dumelow – Railway Queen (1930)
- P E A Clark - Railway Queen (1931)
- H M Goodall - Railway Queen (1932)
- Gracie Jones - Railway Queen (1933)
- Ruby Dovey - Railway Queen (1934)
- Audrey Mosson – Railway Queen (1935)
- Irene Easton – Railway Queen (1936)
- Irene Topham - Railway Queen (1937)
- Ella Forest - Railway Queen (1938)
- Kathleen Lawton - Railway Queen (1939)
- Dorothy Norwood - Railway Queen (1945)
- Greta Richards - Railway Queen (1946)
- Janet Taylor - Railway Queen (1947)
- Beryl Parker - Railway Queen (1948)
- Janet Hubbard - Railway Queen (1949)
- Betty Chester - Railway Queen (1950)
- Eluned Jones - Railway Queen (1951)
- Sheila Hollingsworth - Railway Queen (1952)
- Beryl Lunt - Railway Queen (1953)
- Marion Long - Railway Queen (1954)
- Maureen Hugill - Railway Queen (1955)
- Brenda Bower - Railway Queen (1956)
- Teresa Boyden - Railway Queen (1957)
- Gloria Cripps - Railway Queen (1958)
- Hazel Dobinson - Railway Queen (1959)
- Sheila Riordan - Railway Queen (1960)
- Susan Garside - Railway Queen (1961)
- Lynnette Storr - Railway Queen (1970)
- Brenda Tomlinson – Railway Queen (1975)

== Textile Queens ==
Textile industries embraced the idea of queens from the late 1920s, to act as ambassadors for the industry in face of a crash in cotton prices. Queens from a variety of textile industries were popular in the 1930s, but social changes after the Second World War meant that they did not return to their previous popularity. In 1949 a new 'Textile Queen' competition was launched in Blackpool, but it was not repeated.

=== Cotton Queens ===
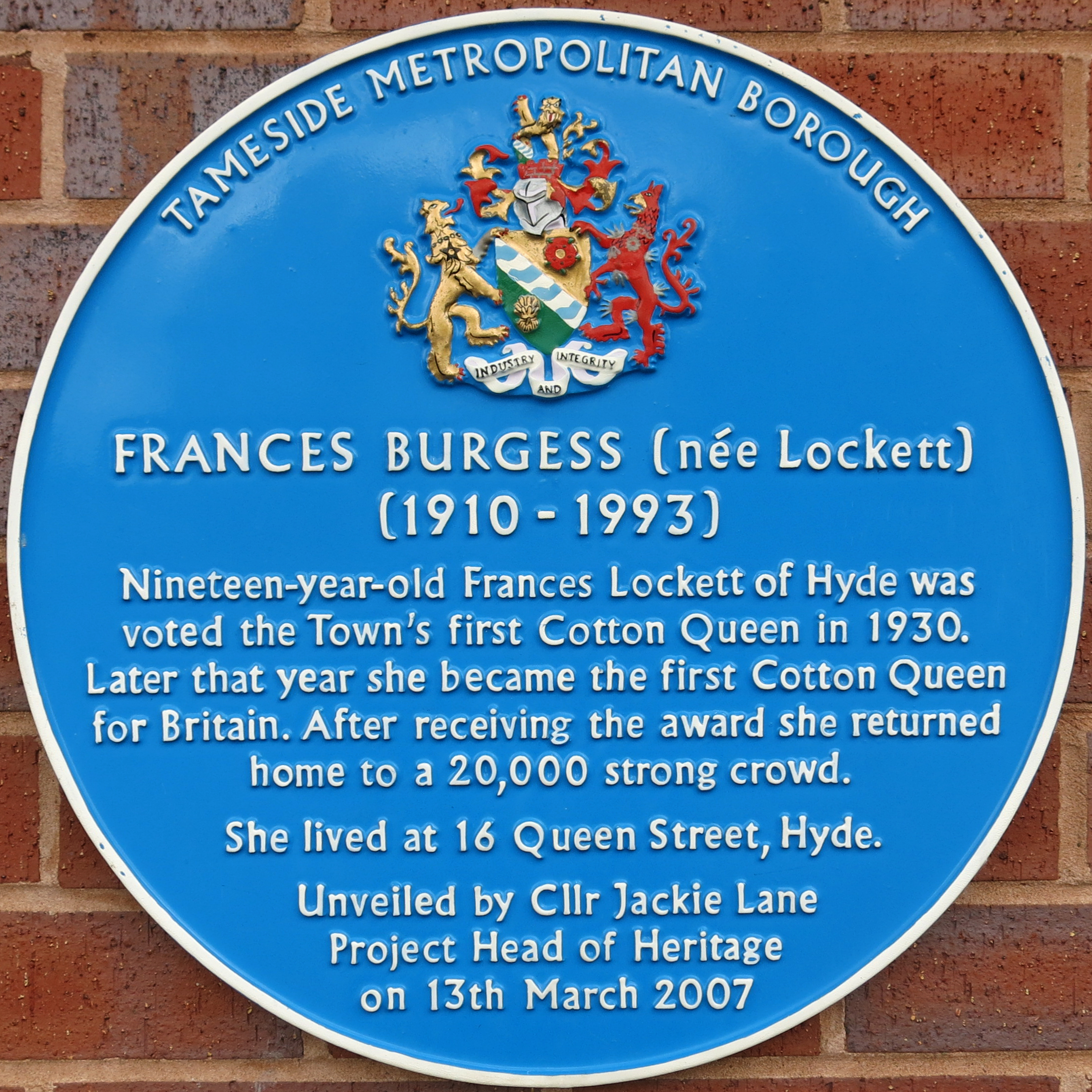
Blue plaque commemorating Frances Burgess

The first Cotton Queen – the winner of the Cotton Queen Quest, Frances Lockett, was crowned in 1930. The competition was started by the newspaper the Daily Dispatch, which launched a search for 'the most beautiful girl in the cotton industry'. This competition was open to women who worked in the industry from Cheshire, Lancashire and Derbyshire. Lancashire was central to the development of the Cotton Queen – the music hall song ‘She's a Lassie from Lancashire’ was even used as the official theme. Each new Queen was obliged to travel around the country, acting as a representative and advocate for the cotton industry for a year after her win.

On 3 July 1930, when Lockett returned home to Hyde, near Manchester, tens of thousands of people lined the streets and she had to have a police escort. Even after her time as the cotton queen, she was still in high demand to attend charity events and was a celebrity in Hyde until her death.

Marjorie Knowles, who was crowned Cotton Queen in 1932, raised morale through her work at a time of high unemployment. Knowles had previously been crowned Burnley Cotton Queen three weeks before the national competition. During her year as queen, she met Prime Minister Ramsay MacDonald.

The Cotton Queen Quest stopped in 1939 due to the outbreak of the Second World War.

==== Winners ====
- Frances Lockett (1930)
- Lois Heath (1931)
- Marjorie Knowles (1932)
- Alice Kirkham (1933)
- Vera Greenwood (1937)
- Laura Cowans (1938)
- Irene Harrison (1939)

=== Wool Queens ===
Taking the lead from Lancashire's Cotton Queens, Yorkshire's Wool Industry also ran competitions to select women to represent it. Local support was key and the Dewsbury Wool Queen competition was organised by the Leeds Mercury newspaper.

In 1931, Mary Wood was crowned Dewsbury Wool Queen. In 1947 Doreen Fletcher was crowned Yorkshire Wool Queen and was chosen to star in a film called Three Piece Suit, which was designed to encourage young women to join the wool industry. Due to its success Fletcher later had a career as a singer, model and actress.

=== Silk Queens ===
In addition to cotton and wool, but lesser known, were the Queens associated with Britain's Silk Industry. In 1933, Alice Lilian King was crowned Silk Queen, in a ceremony that was filmed.

== Coal Queens ==
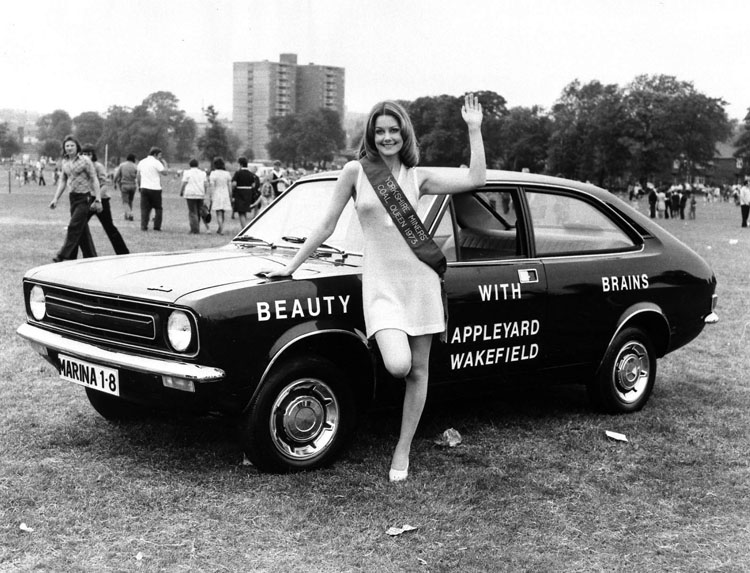
Yorkshire Miners' Coal Queen 1973 waves to the camera at a Coal Board gala

The National Coal Queen of Britain competition was introduced in 1969 and the last event was held in 1996. It was a collaboration between the National Coal Board and the National Union of Mine Workers. However smaller, local competitions had been held since the 1950s. Entrants had to either work for the Board, or have a relative who did. Runners-up became escorts of the new Coal Queen, and were known as 'The Miners' Lamps'. Winners of the pageant could win holidays, money and clothes. The 1977 winner, Marie Redford, won her weight in Babycham.

Women competed in colliery, then regional events, moving towards a national final. This final event was held in either Blackpool or Skegness. From 1969 to 1976 the event was held at the Derbyshire Miners’ Holiday Centre in Skegness; from 1977 to 1983 it was held at Blackpool's annual Mining Weekend. The Northumberland Coal Queen was usually crowned on the annual Picnic Day. There were fifteen National Coal Queens in total, many of whom met up at reunions later in life.

Duties for successful queens varied considerably: from escorting trains, as the 1972 Yorkshire coal queen Margaret Dominiak who travelled from Kellingley Colliery to Drax Power Station, to representing the industry at international events. Former Coal Queen Deborah Tate emphasised that for many women it was also an honour and opportunity to represent your community.

=== Winners ===
National

- 1969 Rose McLachlan
- 1970 Jean Robson
- 1971 Judith Hargreaves (later Henderson)
- 1972 Margaret Dominiak (later Lister)
- 1973 Cathy Wilkinson (later Isenberg)
- 1974 Pat Verey (later Smith)
- 1975 Sue O'Connor
- 1976 Yvette Shilton
- 1977 Marie Redford (later Dane)
- 1978 Ann Melling
- 1979 Debbie Johnson
- 1980 Carole Boulton
- 1981 Tricia Liedl
- 1982 Susan Brown
- 1983 Lyn Tomlinson

Durham

- 1969 Rose McLachlan
- 1970 Jean Robson
- 1971 Rosemarie Osborne
- 1972 Jacquie Short
- 1973 Susan Dormand
- 1974 Olwyn Paul
- 1975 Joan Calder
- 1976 Jacquie Bowman
- 1977 Kim Nast
- 1978 Beverley Brown
- 1979 Andrea Buckley
- 1980 Heather Hardy
- 1981 Julie Ramshaw
- 1982 Linda Dent
- 1983 Jill Carter
- 1984 Sue Davison

Northumberland

- 1969 Linda Todd
- 1970 Margaret Thornton
- 1971 Sharon Freeman
- 1972 Christine Lavender
- 1973 Iris Allison
- 1974 Marion Rice
- 1975 Mary Baxter
- 1976 Cindy Mullarkey
- 1977 Marie Redford (later Dane)
- 1978 Frances Cogan
- 1979 Karen Bell
- 1980 Muriel Mullarkey
- 1981 Linda Flannigan
- 1982 Deborah Bramley (later Tate)
- 1983 Jackie Grey
- 1984 Dawn Marie Anderson

South Wales

- 1980 Carole Boulton

Yorkshire

- 1972 Margaret Dominiak (later Lister)

== Around the world ==
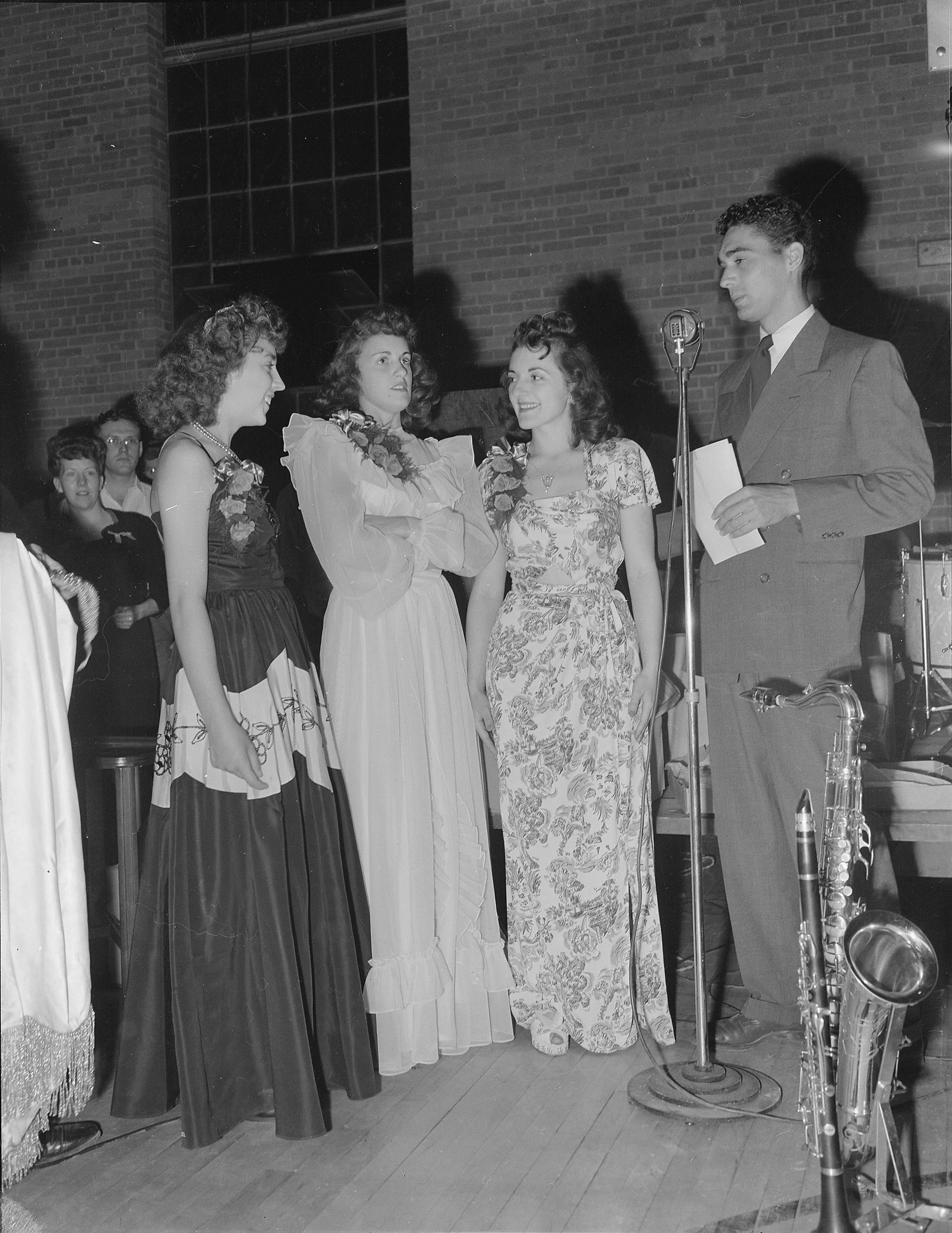
Coal Queen Crowning in Utah at a Fourth of July Celebration

=== Argentina ===
A popular national contest in Argentina, is to become the 'Queen of Fishermen', representing the industry.

=== Germany ===
Similar queens are crowned in Germany annually or biannually, mostly in the agricultural sector like viticulture. Winners are often chosen from families involved in that particular field and have ceremonial and promotional functions, like opening of trade fairs. There is an association of such figures to allow for coordination of promotional events.

=== United States ===
The tradition still thrives in America, particularly in the Bituminous Coal Queen pageant in Pennsylvania, where the competition also includes a general knowledge test. A 2005 documentary The Bituminous Coal Queens of Pennsylvania examined the story of Sarah Rush, a former queen.

In the 1930s, Tobacco Queens became popular in the US, with several regional contests beginning across Georgia, Virginia, North Carolina and South Carolina.

== Legacy ==
=== Film ===
The British film Cotton Queen was produced in 1937, directed by Bernard Vorhaus and starring Mary Lawson and Stanley Holloway In it, Lawson, as the daughter of a mill owner, spies on her father's rival.

=== Exhibitions ===
Several exhibitions have been held at museum in the UK on the topic, including:

- National Coal Mining Museum – Celebrating 50 years of Coal Queens (2019)
- Leeds Industrial Museum – Queens of Industry (2017–19)
- National Coal Mining Museum – Coal Queens (2010)

=== Literature ===
Queens of Industry have been depicted in several novels, including:

- The Cotton Queen – Pamela Morsi (Mira Books, 2006)
- Death and the Brewery Queen - Frances Brody (Little Brown Book Group, 2020)
- Gracie Fairshaw and the Mysterious Guest - Susan Brownrigg (Uclan Publishing, 2020)
- Gracie Fairshaw and the Trouble at the Tower - Susan Brownrigg (Uclan Publishing, 2021)

== Historiography ==
The work and the legacy of the phenomenon of Queens of Industry is one that would benefit from further research and much of what has been done has been compiled by researchers in the museum sector.

== See also ==
- Carmichaels, Pennsylvania
