= Thomas Hill (dean of Ossory) =

Anglican priest

Thomas Hill (1 February 1636 – 1 November 1674) was an Anglican priest in Ireland during the late 18th and early 19th centuries.

Hillwas educated at Trinity College, Dublin. He was Dean of Ossory from 1671 until his death.
