= Percy Francis =

English cricketer

Cricket information
- Batting: Right-handed

Career statistics
Competition	First-class
Matches	3
Runs scored	95
Batting average	23.75
100s/50s	0/1
Top score	66
Catches/stumpings	0/–
- Source: Cricinfo, 8 November 2022

Percy Thomas Francis (6 May 1875 – 8 September 1964) was an English cricketer, who played three first-class matches for Worcestershire in 1901 and 1902. He later appeared for Suffolk in minor cricket.

Much Francis's highest score was the 66 he hit in the second innings of his debut against Cambridge University at Fenner's.

He was born in Badwell Ash, Suffolk; he died at the age of 89 in Branksome, Poole, Dorset.
