= Katharine Poulton =

Katharine Margaret Poulton (born 1961) has been Archdeacon of Meath and Kildare since June 2025. She is also a Canon of the National Cathedral of St Patrick, Dublin, and Rector of Julianstown.

Poulton was educated at the University of Manchester and ordained in 1987, as the first woman ordained as deacon in the Church of Ireland. After curacies in Bangor, Seagoe, Kilwaughter and Greystones she was the Bishop's curate at St George and St Thomas, Dublin from 2000 to 2010.
