= John Pooley =

English bishop

The Most Reverend and Right Honourable John Pooley, DD
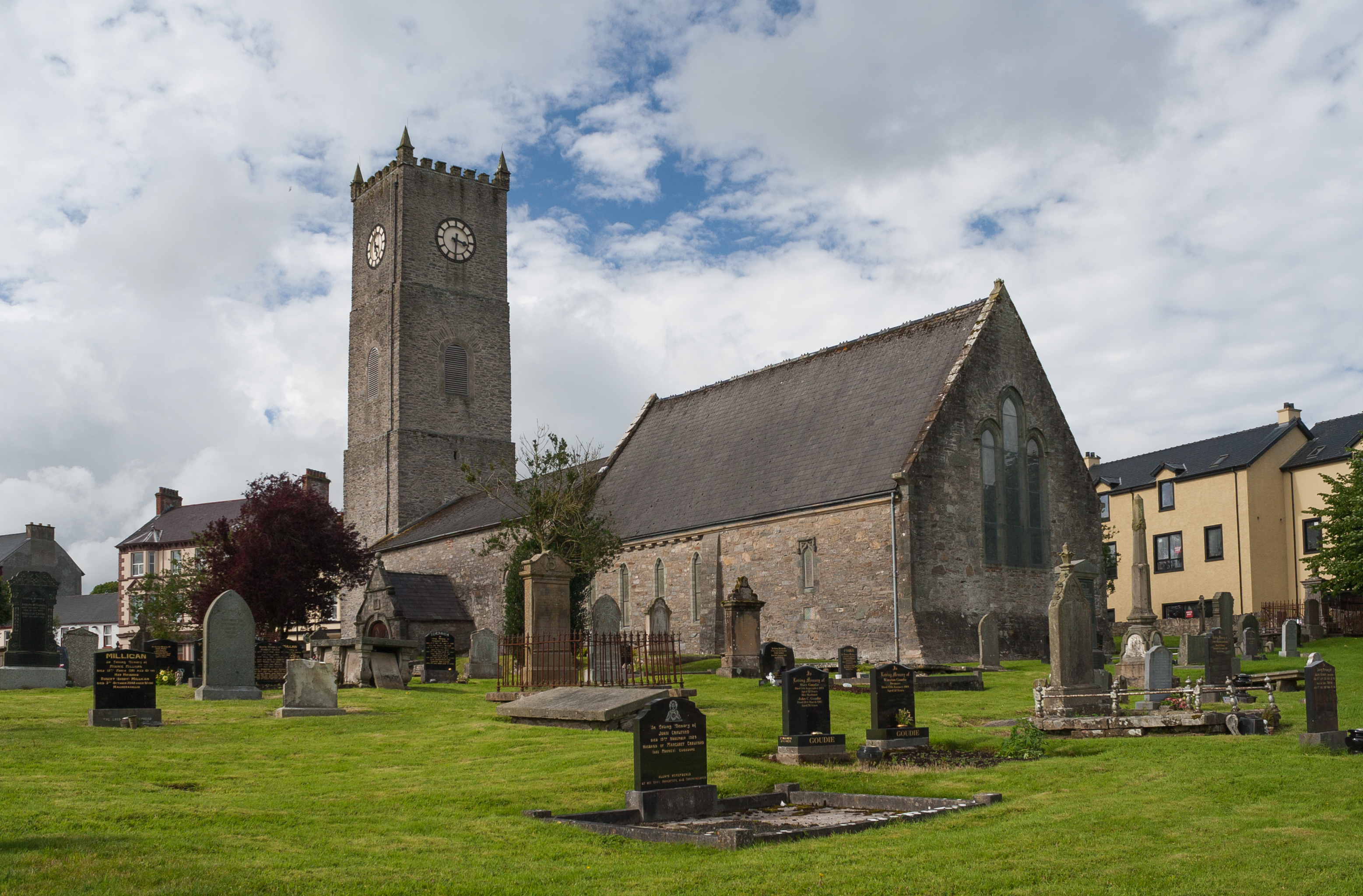
- St Eunan's Cathedral, Raphoe, where Pooley was bishop from 1702 to 1712
- Church: Church of Ireland
- See: Bishop of Raphoe
- In office: 1702–1712
- Predecessor: Robert Huntington
- Successor: Thomas Lindsay
- Other posts: Bishop of Cloyne 1697 - 1702; Dean of Ossory, 1674; Prebendary, Christ Church Cathedral, Dublin 1673

Orders
- Ordination: 6 March 1674
- Consecration: 12 September 1702

Personal details
- Born: 30 January 1645 Ipswich Suffolk, England
- Died: 16 October 1712 (aged 67) Dublin
- Buried: St. Michan's Church, Dublin
- Denomination: Church of Ireland
- Education: Trinity College, Dublin; Doctor of Divinity University of Oxford 1682

John Pooley (1645-1712) was a member of the Church of Ireland, who was Bishop of Cloyne from 1697 to 1702, then Bishop of Raphoe until his death in October 1712.

== Career ==
Born in Ipswich around 1645, Pooley was educated at St Patrick's Cathedral Grammar School, in Dublin, the future Duke of Marlborough being one of his classmates. He graduated from Trinity College, where he became a senior fellow. He was appointed the vicar of the Parish of Leixlip, St Mary's and served in this position from 1670 to 1674. He was appointed Prebendary of St. Michan's Church, Dublin, then Dean of Ossory on 6 March 1674. He served as personal chaplain to the Earl of Essex, Lord Lieutenant of Ireland from 1672 to 1677, as well as his successor, the Duke of Ormond. One of Ormond' positions was that of Chancellor of Oxford University, and Pooley was made Doctor of Divinity there in July 1682.

On 2 December 1697, he was consecrated Bishop of Cloyne, spending much of his time on an unsuccessful legal campaign to regain episcopal lands lost in prior decades. In 1702, he became Bishop of Raphoe in Ulster, one of the more valuable sees; in 1714, Archbishop King described it as 'worth near £1,200...(but) full of Dissenters and Papists'. A contemporary complained in the eleven years he served as bishop, Pooley 'hardly resided eighteen months.'

As a bishop, Pooley sat in the Irish House of Lords and spoke against the 1703 Popery Act. He specifically objected to the requirement office holders abjure or deny the claim of the Catholic Stuart exiles, and avoided doing so himself until 1710. As a result, he was briefly deprived of his bishopric before having it restored in September 1710. He was briefly held in Dublin Castle in 1709 for protesting against a Parliamentary session being scheduled on a Holy day.

Pooley was responsible for restoring St. Michan's Church, Dublin, described as being in a 'ruinous condition' in the 1680s, and the expansion of St Eunan's Cathedral. His will left £200 for a building programme, which was not completed until years after his death. Most of it was replaced in the late 19th century, apart from a baptismal font installed in 1706, which can still be seen.

He died in Dublin on 16 October 1712, and was buried in St. Michan's.

== Sources ==
- Burtchaell, George Dames; Sadleir, Thomas Ulick, eds. (1935). Alumni Dublinenses : a register of the students, graduates, professors and provosts of Trinity College in the University of Dublin (1593-1860). Alex Thom and Co.
- Bray, GL (2006). Records of Convocation XVII: Ireland, 1690-1869: Both Houses: 1690-1702; Upper House: 1703-1713. Woodbridge Boydell Press. ISBN 978-1-843832331.
- Cotton, H (1878). Fasti Ecclesiae Hibernicae: The succession of the prelates Volume 2. Hodges & Smith.
- Doyle, Thomas (1997). "Jacobitism, Catholicism and the Irish Protestant Elite, 1700-1710". Eighteenth-Century Ireland / Iris an Dá Chultúr. 12: 28–59. doi:10.3828/eci.1997.4. JSTOR 30071383.
- Fryde, Edmund Boleslav; Greenway, D.E.; Porter, S.; Roy, I. (1986). Handbook of British chronology. Offices of the Royal Historical Society : University College. OCLC 989682481.
- Mant, Richard (1840). History Of The Church Of Ireland: From The Revolution To The Union Of The Churches Of England And Ireland, January 1, 1801 (2015 ed.). Palala. ISBN 978-1342559333.
- Rowan, Alistair (1979). North West Ulster: The Counties of London Derry, Donegal, Fermanagh and Tyrone. Yale University Press. ISBN 978-0300096675.
- Ware, Sir James (1739). The Whole Works Concerning Ireland Rev. and Improved, Volume 1. E Jones.
- Leslie, J. B.; Fawcett, F. W.; Crooks, D. W. T. (1999). Clergy of Derry and Raphoe. Belfast: Ulster Historical Foundation. ISBN 9780901905871.
