= Robert Pike (bishop) =

Robert Bonsall Pike was Bishop of Meath from 1959 until his death on 27 December 1973.

Born on 19 October 1905, educated at Trinity College, Dublin and ordained in 1930 he began his career with a curacy at Drumcree.

He was then Curate-in-charge of Aghavilly. He married H. K. Joan Moffat Wilson (1917-2005) on 21 April 1938 at St Brigid's Church, Stillorgan. He held incumbencies at Maryborough, Ballyfin, and Dysart Enos, was Rural Dean of Aghade and then Dean of Ossory (1957–1959) before his ordination to the episcopate.

== Notes ==
Religious titles
| Preceded by James McCann | Bishop of Meath | Succeeded by Diocese amalgamated |
