= John Lewis (dean of Ossory) =

Irish Anglican cleric

John Lewis (1717–1783) was Dean of Ossory from 1755 to 1783.

He was educated at Westminster School and Christ Church, Oxford, where he matriculated in 1734 and graduated B.A. in 1738. He died on 28 June 1783.
