= Edward Warren (priest) =

Irish Anglican dean

Edward Warren was an Irish Anglican dean in the 17th century.

He graduated from Trinity College, Dublin, B.A. in 1608 and M.A. in 1612.

He was Dean of Emly from 1661 to 1626 when he became Dean of Ossory.

One of his sons, Major Abel Warren, was MP for Kilkenny and predeceased him; the other and his heir, Edward, was executed for treason in 1663.
