= Badwell Ash =

Village in Suffolk, England

Coordinates: 52.2832°N 0.9165°E

Badwell of the Ash
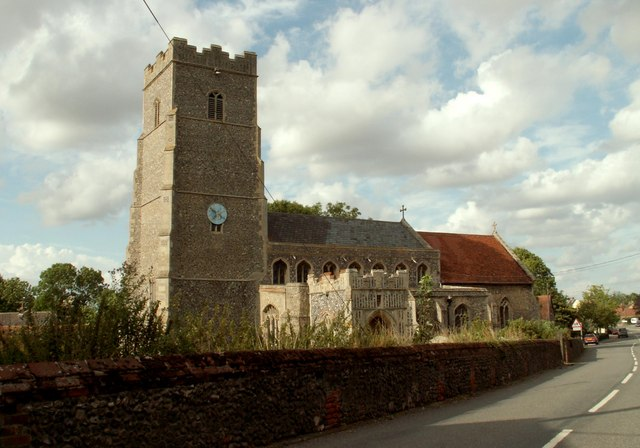
- St. Mary's, Badwell Ash

- Location within Suffolk
- Interactive map of Badwell of the Ash
- Population: 770 (2011)
- OS grid reference: TL9969
- District: Mid Suffolk
- Shire county: Suffolk
- Region: East
- Country: England
- Sovereign state: United Kingdom
- Post town: Bury St Edmunds
- Postcode district: IP31
- Police: Suffolk
- Fire: Suffolk
- Ambulance: East of England
- UK Parliament: Waveney Valley

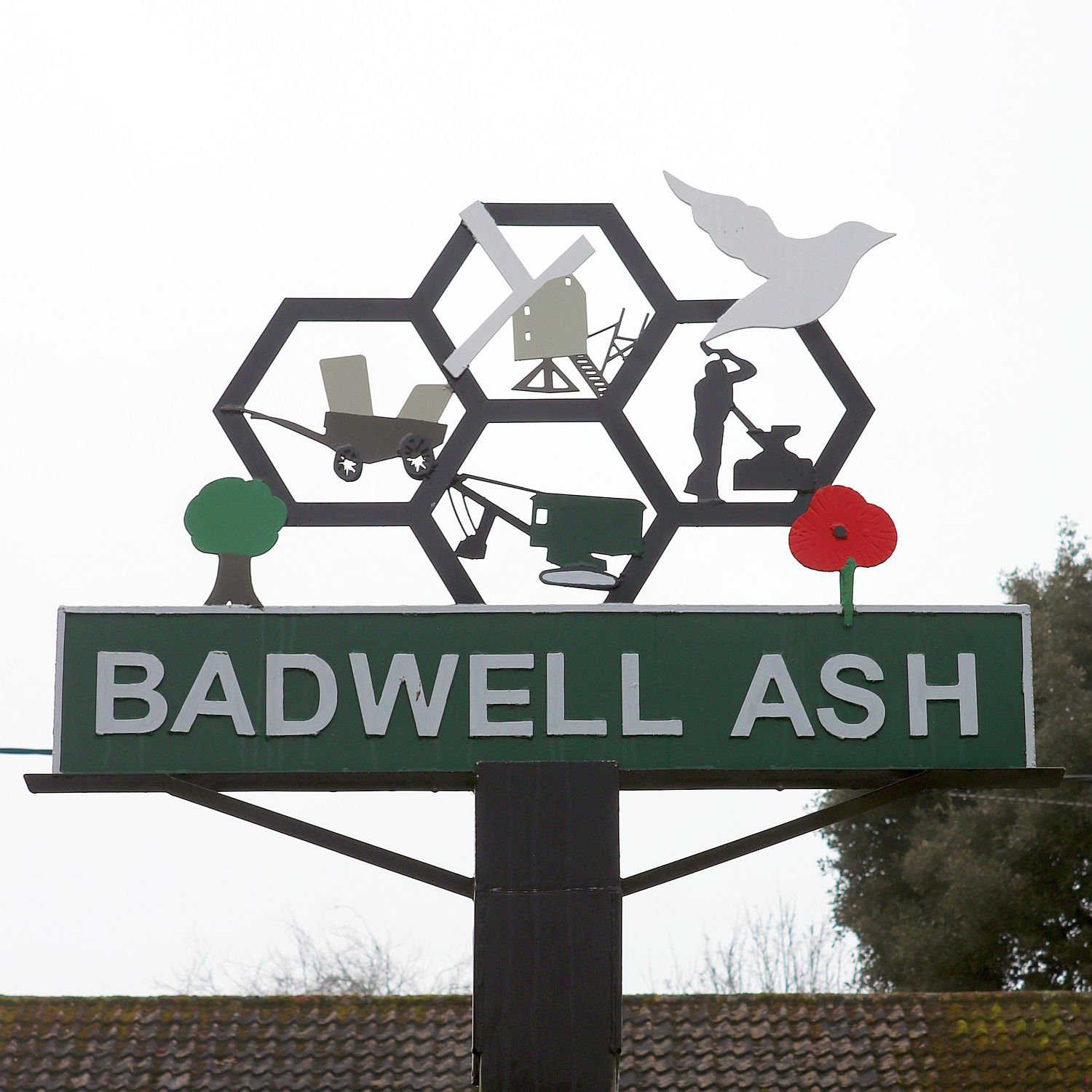
Badwell Ash Village Sign

Badwell Ash is a village and civil parish in the Mid Suffolk district of Suffolk, England, near Bury St Edmunds and Stowmarket.

According to the 2001 census it had a population of 685, increasing to 770 at the 2011 Census.

Facilities in the village include a church, pub, fish and chip shop, and a Post Office/Village shop that is stocked with everyday items. There are daily bus services from the village to nearby towns and the main A14 trunk road is less than a 10-minute drive away. The primary school unfortunately was forced to close after a struggle of being placed under the category of Special Measures by Ofsted. Closure was suggested by Suffolk County Council in May 2013. The closure happened in December 2013.

There are several groups in the village providing activities for the whole age range (Silver Ash, Gun Club, Bowls Club, Art Club, and as of August 2007, a Youth Club run by Stacey Hawes and a Football club). Thus encompassing the wide-ranging Civil Society groups in the village.

There are five bells that hang at St Mary's with the largest weighing 13-2-9 cwt. The oldest bell was cast in 1630 by John Draper. In 2017 the clock and bells of the church were refurbished and now the bells ring every hour on the hour.

In 2006, in response to a questionnaire circulated round the village, a Community Forum was established which organised and ran a village fete - the first one for many years. In 2007 the Forum merged with an existing village hall committee, and has since run a second village fete.

Tourism to the village is encouraged due to the Badwell Ash Holiday Lodges.

== Notable residents ==
- Percy Francis (1875-1964), cricketer
