= Audrey Mosson =

- Born: Elsie Audrey Mosson; 3 September 1920; Preston, Lancashire, England, United Kingdom
- Died: 1 September 2009 (aged 88); Hastings, England, United Kingdom
- Occupations: Celebrity, dancer, Railway Queen
- Known for: 10th inductee of Railway Queen of Great Britain '

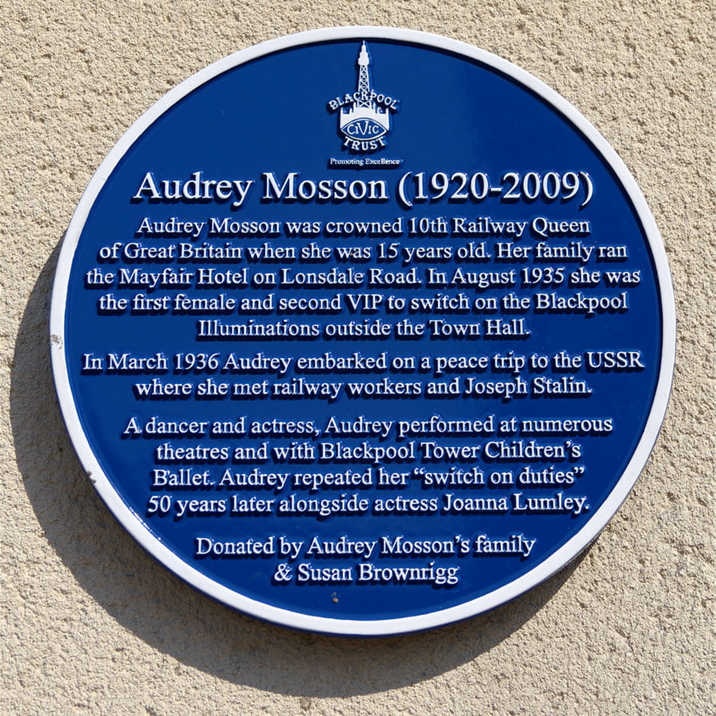
Blue Plaque dedicated to Audrey Mosson at Lonsdale Avenue, Blackpool

Elsie Audrey Mosson (Note: also, mistakenly, Audrey Mossom in some sources) (3 September 1920, Preston – 1 September 2009, Hastings) was an English teen celebrity and later a professional dancer. She was a Railway Queen of Great Britain, and twice turned on the Blackpool Illuminations.

== Biography ==
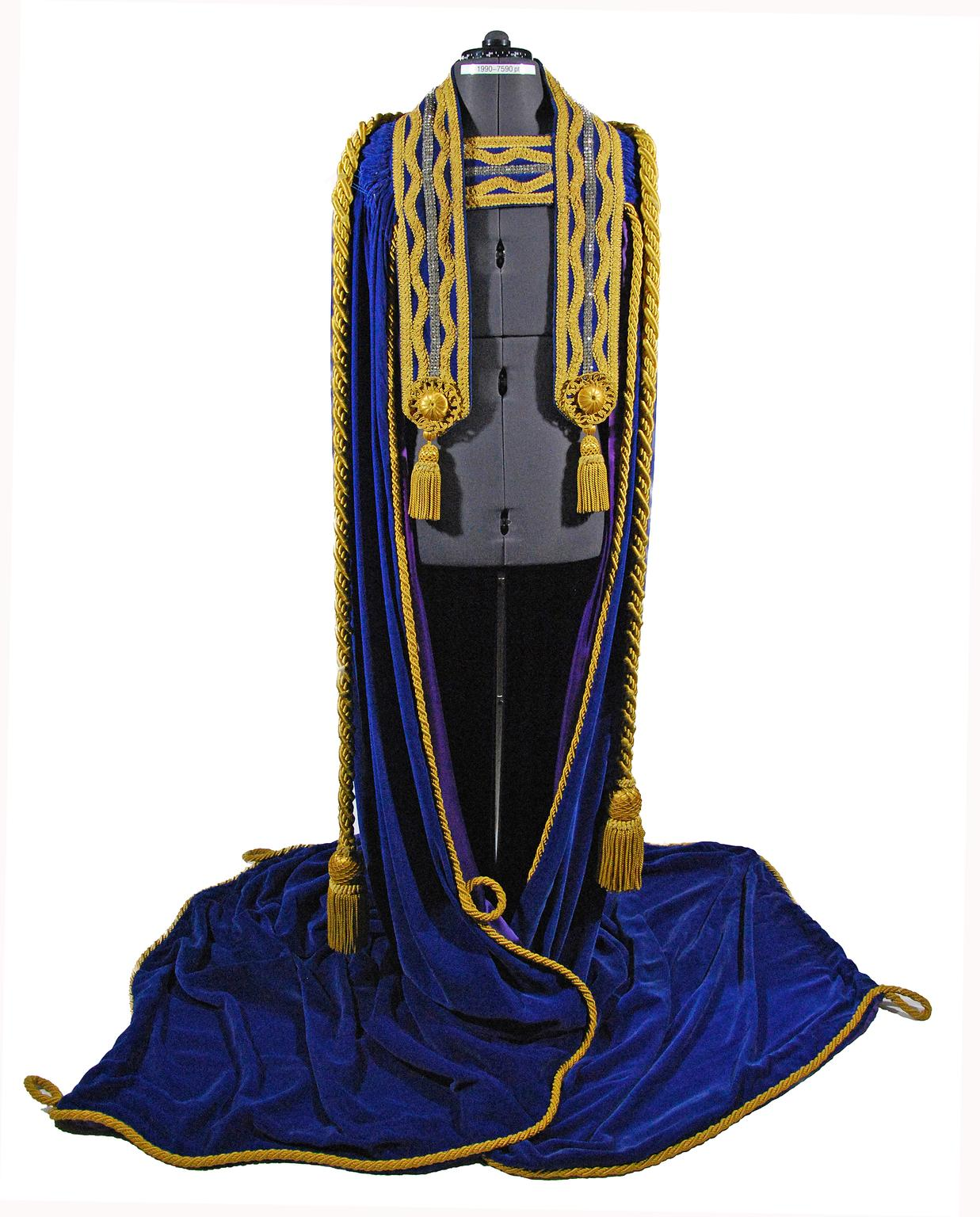
Railway Queen - Velvet Gown

Mosson was born in Preston, Lancashire, and made her stage debut with the Blackpool Tower Children's Ballet.

She was crowned the 10th Railway Queen of Great Britain at the Railway Carnival and Pageant held at 12Belle Vue, Manchester in August 1935 when she was 15 years old. Later in 1935, she turned on the Blackpool Illuminations, an annual lights festival in Blackpool. 50 years later, she again turned on the Blackpool Illuminations alongside actress Joanna Lumley.

In 1936, she travelled to the Soviet Union on a peace visit and met Joseph Stalin.

Audrey and her two sisters all married on the same day at a triple wedding at St Peter's, Blackpool in 1940. It was also their parents' wedding anniversary.

A blue plaque was unveiled celebrating the achievements of Audrey Mosson at her former family home, Lonsdale Road, on 20 May 2023.

== Popular culture ==
Mosson features in the children's books Gracie Fairshaw and the Mysterious Guest and Gracie Fairshaw and the Trouble at the Tower by author Susan Brownrigg.
