= Robert Mossom (bishop) =

Irish bishop

Robert Mossom (1617 – 1679) was Bishop of Derry from 1666 to 1679.

== Life ==
He was a native of Lincolnshire. He entered Magdalene College, Cambridge, on 2 June 1631, but two months later migrated to Peterhouse, Cambridge, where he was admitted a sizar on 9 Aug., and where he was a fellow student with Richard Crashaw and Joseph Beaumont, afterwards master of the college. and ordained in 1642.

He graduated B.A. in 1634 and M.A. in 1638. In 1642 he was officiating at York as an army chaplain under Sir Thomas Glemham, and about this time he married a Miss Eland of Bedale. A committed Royalist, after many years as a military chaplain he became the incumbent at Knaresborough in 1660.

Subsequently, for at least five years (1650–5), during the interregnum, he publicly preached at St. Peter's, Paul's Wharf, London, where, notwithstanding the prohibition of the law, he used the Book of Common Prayer, and administered the holy communion monthly. This brought a great concourse of nobility and gentry to the church. After he had been silenced, Mossom maintained himself by keeping a school. After that he was precentor at Christ Church, Dublin until his elevation to the episcopate.

He died at Derry on 21 December 1679: his grandson, Robert Mossom was Professor of Divinity at Trinity College, Dublin and Dean of Ossory from 1703 until 1747.

== Works ==
- The preachers tripartite in three books. The first to raise devotion in divine meditations upon Psalm XXV : the second to administer comfort by conference with the soul, in particular cases of conscience : the third to establish truth and peace, in several sermons against the present heresies and schisms

== Notes ==
Attribution

This article incorporates text from a publication now in the public domain: Cooper, Thompson (1894). "Mossom, Robert". In Lee, Sidney (ed.). Dictionary of National Biography. Vol. 39. London: Smith, Elder & Co.

Church of Ireland titles
Preceded by George Wilde	Bishop of Derry; 1666–1679	Succeeded by Michael Ward
