= Robert Mossom (priest) =

Irish Anglican cleric

Robert Mossom, grandson of Robert Mossom, Bishop of Derry and Professor of Divinity at Trinity College, Dublin, was Dean of Ossory from 1703 until 1747: he was also Vicar general of the diocese.

== Notes ==
Church of Ireland titles
Preceded by John Pooley	Dean of Ossory; 1747–1769	Succeeded by Richard Marlay
