= Dean of Ossory =

Church of Ireland official

The Dean of Ossory or Dean of Kilkenny is based at The Cathedral Church of St Canice, Kilkenny in the united Diocese of Cashel and Ossory within the Church of Ireland.

The current dean is the Very Reverend Stephen Farrell, formerly Rector of Zion parish, Rathgar, Dublin, and provincial and diocesan registrar for the Diocese of Dublin and Glendalough.

== List of deans of Ossory ==
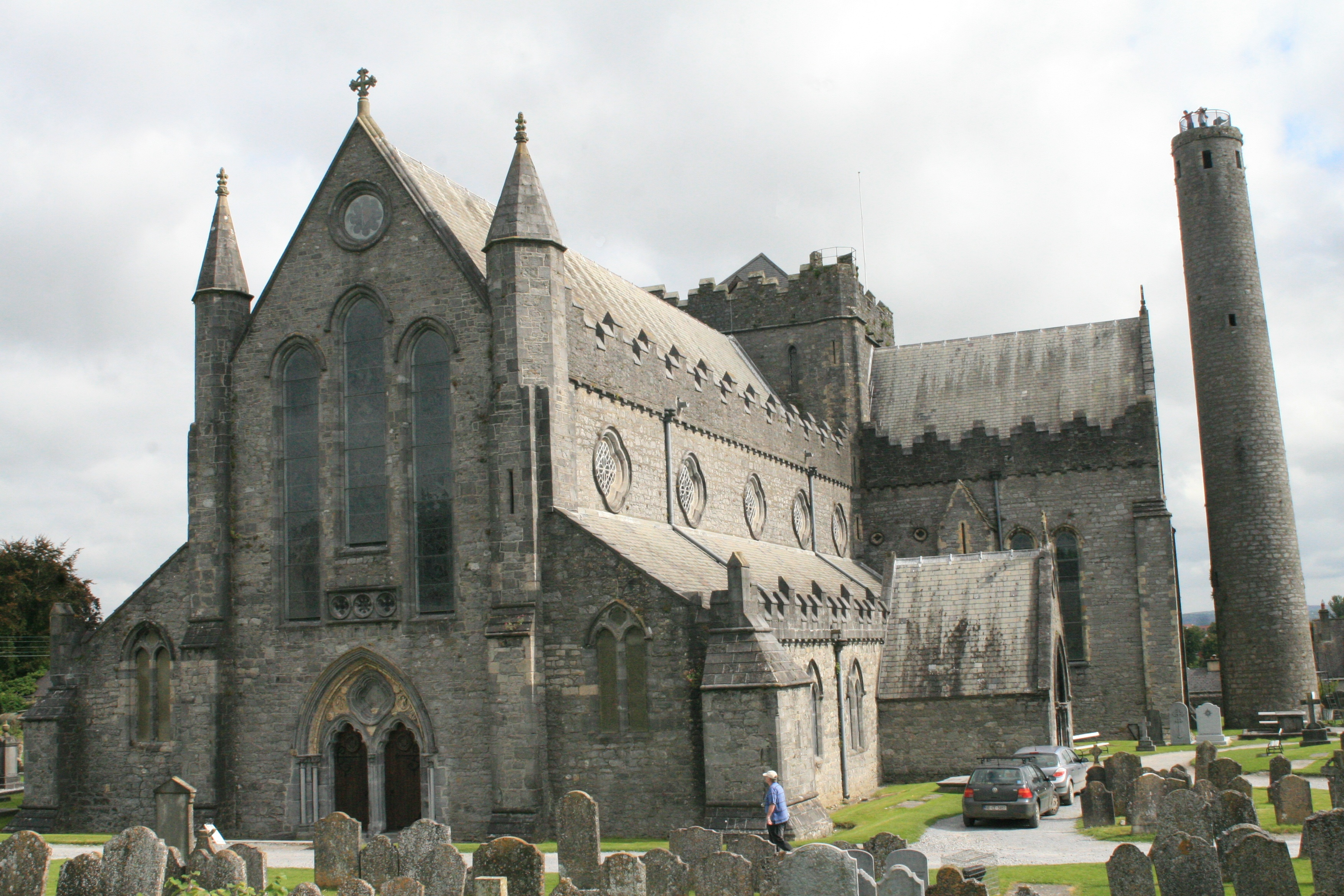
St Canice's Cathedral, Kilkenny

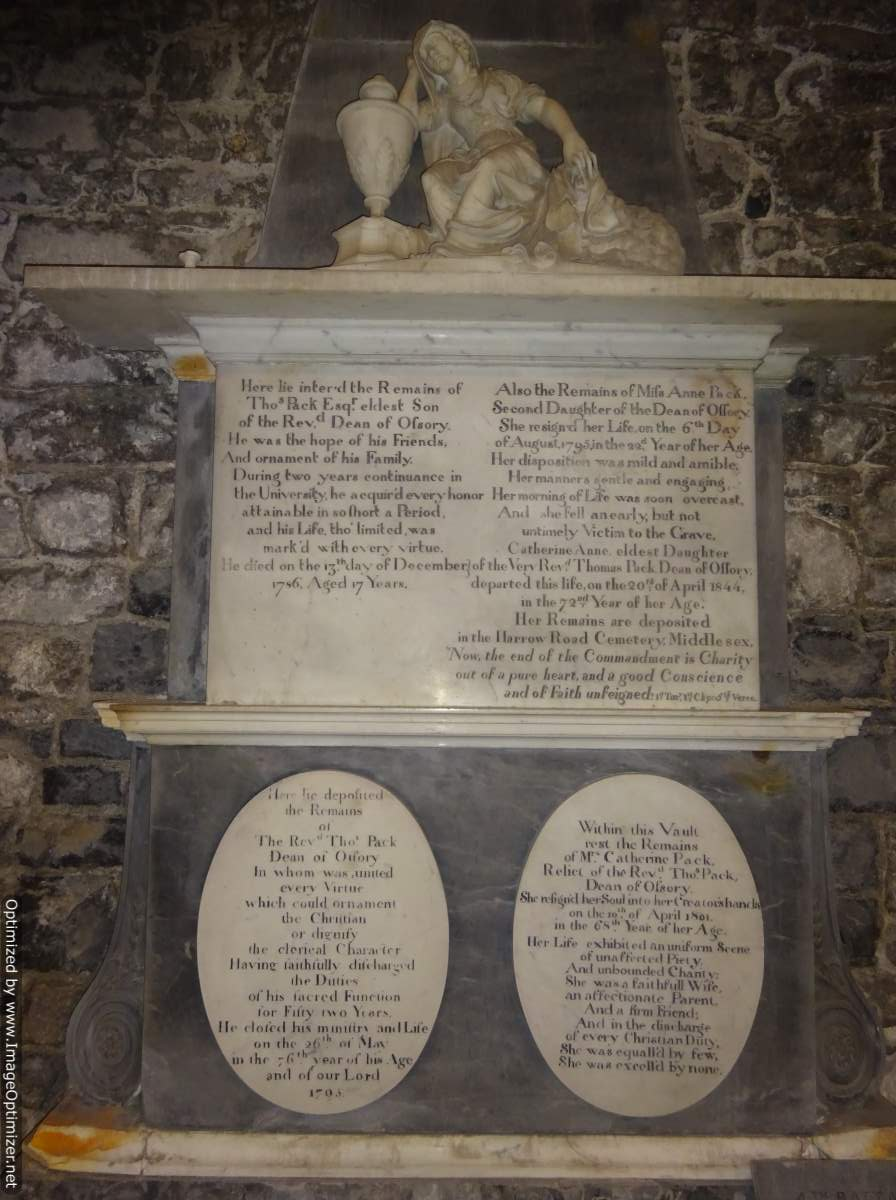
Memorial to the Rev. Thomas Pack, Dean 1784–1795.

- 1547–1552 James Bicton
- 1552–1555 Thomas Lancaster (also Bishop of Kildare, deprived 1555)
- 1559–1581 William Johnson
- 1582 David Cleere
- 1603–1610 Richard Deane (afterwards Bishop of Ossory
- 1610–1612 John Todd (also Bishop of Down and Connor 1607–1612)
- 1612 Barnabas Boulger
- 1617 Absolom Gethin
- 1621 Jenkin Mayes
- 1626–1661 Edward Warren
- 1661–1661 Charles Curren
- 1661–1666 Thomas Ledisham (afterwards Dean of Waterford)
- 1666–1667/8 Daniel Neyland
- 1667/8 Joseph Teate
- 1670/1-1673 Thomas Hill
- 1673/4-1674/5 Benjamin Parry (afterwards Dean of St Patrick's and Bishop of Ossory 1677)
- 1674/5–1697 John Pooley (afterwards Bishop of Cloyne 1697)
- 1702/3–1747 Robert Mossom
- 1747–1753 Robert Watts
- 1755–1783 John Lewis
- 1784–1795 Thomas Pack
- 1795–1843 Hon Joseph Bourke
- 1843–1877 Charles Vignoles
- 1877–1901 Thomas Hare
- 1901–?1905 James Lyons
- 1905–1908 Maurice Day (afterwards Bishop of Clogher 1908)
- 1908–1923 Thomas Edward Winder
- 1923–1940 John Percy Phair (afterwards Bishop of Ossory, Ferns and Leighlin 1940)
- 1940–?1950 James Henry Burrows
- 1950–1957 George Seaver
- ?1957–1959 Robert Pike (afterwards Bishop of Meath, 1959)
- 1959–1969 John George Gash
- 1969–1970 Donald Caird (afterwards Bishop of Limerick, Ardfert and Aghadoe 1970)
- 1970–1991 Brian Harvey
- 1991–2010 Norman Lynas
- 2010–2018 Katharine M. Poulton
- 2018-2021 David McDonnell
- 2021-present Stephen Farrell
