= Women in equestrianism =

Gender studies history

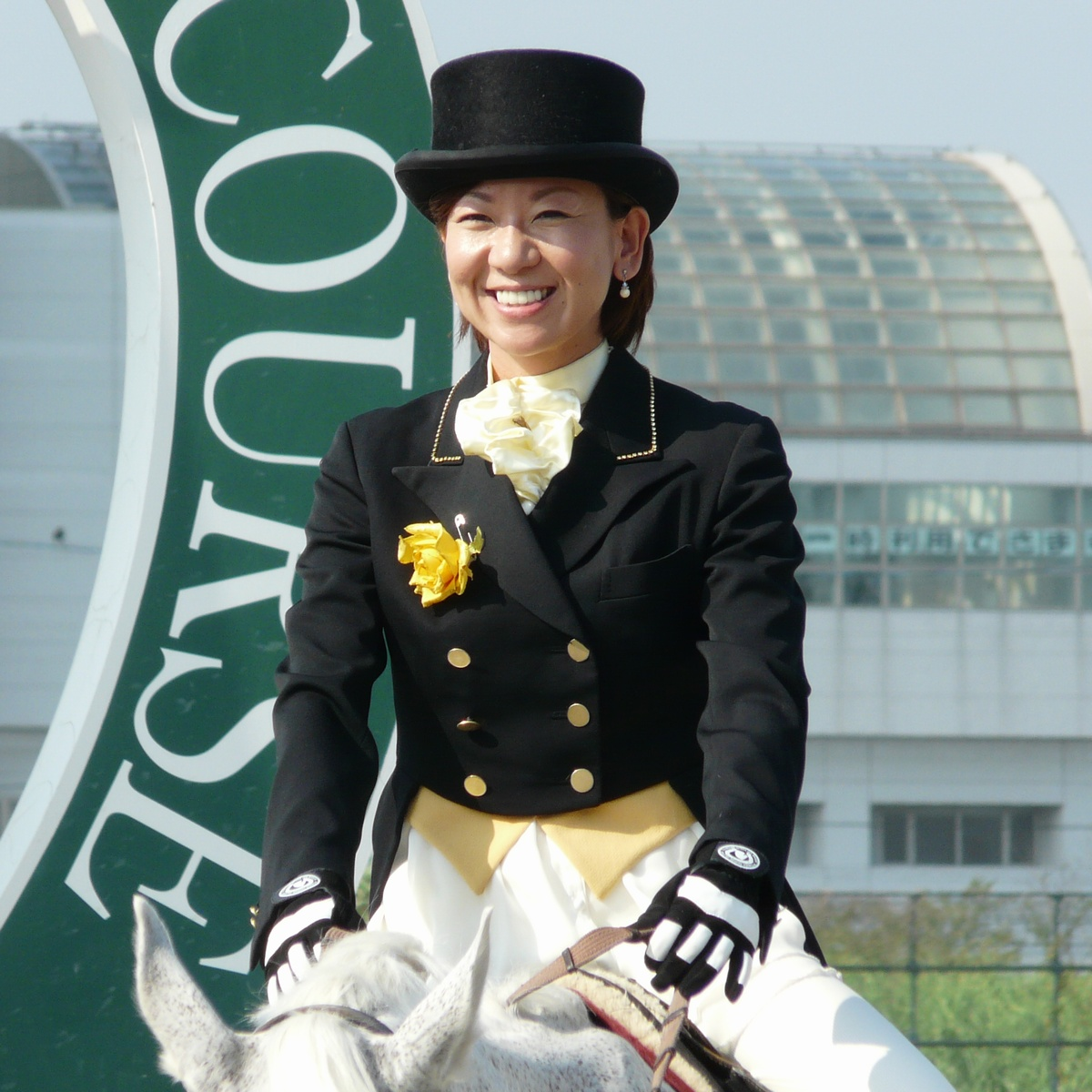
Japan's Chihiro Akami, an example of a female jockey

The place of women in equestrianism has undergone significant societal evolution. Until the 20th century, in most Eurasian and North African countries, and later in North and South America, the horse was primarily a symbol of military and masculine prowess, associated with men for both warfare and daily labor. In contrast, women in ancient Asian cultures like the Scythians, Sarmatians, and Achaemenids are believed to have practiced horsemanship, unlike the Greco-Roman civilizations. In the Near East and Central Asia, access to horseback riding was restricted, particularly during the Safavid period.

References to women riders and warriors are often rooted in myths, such as the Amazons, or describe exceptions where women were limited to roles like caretakers of horses, as seen with the "Servants of the Horse" in the Bamoun kingdom in the 19th century. In Western Europe, horse riding was largely reserved for the elite, restricting access for women, depending on their social status. Conversely, in Central Asia horses were accessible to all social classes for seasonal migrations. By the end of the Middle Ages, the practice of riding sidesaddle became prevalent in Western Europe, further constraining the autonomy of women riders. The American frontier's expansion brought women from various backgrounds into horseback riding and driving, including notable figures like Calamity Jane, helping to challenge the norm of sidesaddle riding in the West.

Until the early 20th century, horses were primarily used as working animals in Western countries. Over the century, the role of horses expanded into urban and female spheres, leading to their status evolving towards that of pets and a notable increase in female participation in horse riding. Despite this shift, women are still underrepresented at the highest levels of equestrian competition, such as show jumping, due to gender-based labor divisions and a focus on the animal's performance rather than the emotional connection. There are still some equestrian practices with low female participation, such as among South American Gauchos.

However, equestrian culture has increasingly embraced women, reflecting the broader feminization of equestrian activities. From the Anglo-Saxon pony books of the 1920s to contemporary television and film, women have gained a more prominent role. Notable works such as National Velvet (1944), Sarraounia (1986), Mulan (1998), and Sport de filles (2012) feature young girls and warrior riders, showcasing the growing representation of women in equestrian narratives.

== Sources and terrain ==
The relationship between women and horses has been addressed by sociologists, ethnologists, and anthropologists, and also by psychoanalysts. Equestrian sports offer a unique perspective for gender studies, as they are the only sporting domain where men and women compete directly against each other in the same events at international and Olympic levels. Since the 1950s, mixed-gender competitions have been a feature in countries that organize show jumping, eventing, and dressage competitions. This has led to the publication of numerous studies throughout the world.

In French scholarship, the primary sociological work addressing the feminization of equestrianism is Catherine Tourre-Malen's thesis and her subsequent book, which focus exclusively on Europe and the West. Émilie Maj calls it a "fine analysis [that] will attract the interest of both audiences, researchers in the humanities, and professionals and enthusiasts of the horse world". For Martine Segalen, the book contributes significantly to the feminization of society and contains fine observations. Catherine Monnot, on the other hand, deplored an initial bias, adding that "the demonstration suffers from a lack that runs through the whole analysis [...] One is led to believe that the author, a horse professional, has so internalized the dominant masculine discourse and values of this milieu, particularly critical of a systematically devalued 'feminine', that she no longer knows how to see and therefore analyze the meanings of the transformations underway". For geographer Sylvie Brunel, this is "a work of synthesis nourished by a long period of theoretical and practical research", but Brunel does not follow Tourre-Malen's conclusion, believing that "it is precisely women's infatuation with equines that have given a new lease of life to an activity that had lost its economic and military usefulness".

== History ==
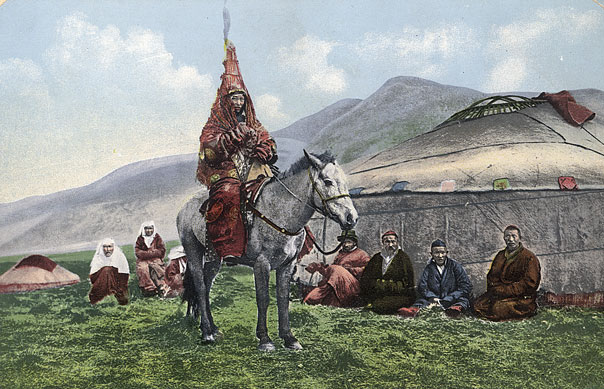
Kazakh woman in traditional dress, astride a horse, circa 1911-1914

Women's relationship with horses appears marginally in historical documents.

There are major differences depending on geographical region, social status, and era. The horse's pre-industrial status implies that women, particularly those from the highest social classes, have always had theoretical access to equitation. Catherine Tourre-Malen identifies three stages in the evolution of women's riding in the Western world: from Antiquity to the 16th century, riding was a passive form of transport, requiring no special training or clothing; the generalization of riding sidesaddle went hand in hand with the quest for a graceful attitude; and third, the development of the "third fork" of the sidesaddle, which enabled women to participate in equestrian activities previously considered dangerous, such as jumping.

The feminization of equestrian practices has been observed in every country in the world since the mid-20th century, with varying degrees of intensity. Jean-Louis Gouraud notes that while this trend is well-documented and widely discussed in developed, urbanized countries such as France, Sweden, and the United States, it often overshadows the historical equestrian practices of women in other regions of the world.

=== Antiquity ===
The earliest evidence of horse domestication is found among the Botai culture in present-day northern Kazakhstan, dating back to between 3,000 and 3,500 BC. From this origin, the practice of domesticating horses and horse riding gradually spread across Eurasia through various cultural interactions.

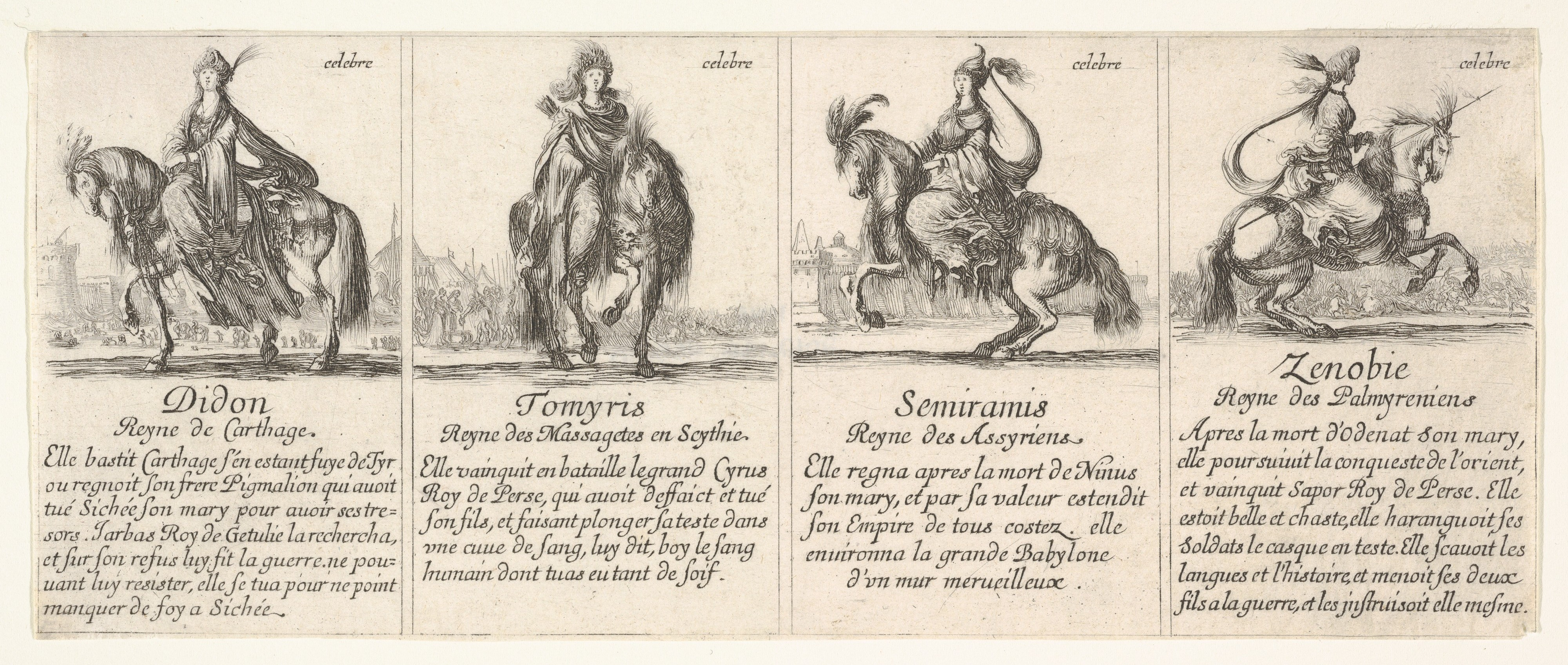
Equestrian portraits of famous queens (all from outside ancient Greece and Rome), from an etching dated 1644: from left to right, Dido, Tomyris, Semiramis, and Zenobia.

According to the Dictionary of Greek and Roman Antiquities, both Greeks and Romans attributed the practice of female horsemanship to foreign queens, such as the Phoenician queen Dido and the legendary Babylonian queen Semiramis.

==== Ancient Greece and the Roman Empire ====
According to Louis L'Allier, Professor of Classical Hellenistic Studies, Greek women were generally not depicted as riders. As described by Xenophon, Greek society was deeply patriarchal, with the public sphere (including horseback riding) reserved for men, while the private sphere (the home) was the domain of women. The horse, associated with the outer world, thus became a symbol primarily for men. L'Allier notes that in the Symposium, Socrates compares the "training" of his wife to that of a horse. The equestrian metaphor is also used by Xenophon to compare Greek women to horses: "Woman is to man what a mount is to a rider: a useful companion to be tamed and mastered".

Paulette Ghiron-Bistagne from Université Paul-Valéry-Montpellier notes that in Greek mythology, the horse often represents violence and savagery. Aeschines, Dio Chrysostom, and Diodorus Siculus recount a myth where a young woman who lost her virginity before marriage was condemned to be locked in a stable with a horse, which then killed her. Furthermore, centaurs, the mythological creatures that are half-human and half-horse, are depicted as violent towards women. For instance, Eurytos attempts to assault Hippodamia, whose name means "horse tamer", and Nessos tries to rape Deianira, the wife of Heracles.

==== Scythians and Sarmatians ====
Greek sources describe the nomadic, horse-riding peoples of present-day Kazakhstan, and by extension Central Asia, as Scythians and Sarmatians, established as early as the 6th century BC. Evidence from around 20% of female Sarmatian tombs reveals that these women were involved in horseback riding and warfare, as many tombs contain harnesses and weapons. This suggests that female equitation, including its use in military contexts, was a common practice among them. However, contemporary written sources, heavily influenced by the myth of the Amazons, do not provide a clear picture of the actual practices of female horsemanship.

According to the Hippocratic treatise Des airs, des eaux et des lieux (Of Airs, Waters and Places), Sauromatian (Sarmatian) women were as warlike as men, rode horses, and had their right breast cauterized to transfer the vigor to their right arm. However, again according to this treatise cited by Alain Ballabriga, riding ceases when these women lose their virginity; they only get back on horseback in the event of extreme peril or mass mobilization.

==== Achaemenid Empire ====
According to Herodotus, horseback riding was a common practice in the Achaemenid Empire, with the horse being the primary mode of transport for the Persian nobility. There is no evidence to suggest that the use of horses was restricted for women. The Roman historian Quintus Curtius Rufus testifies that the queen of Persia, the king's mother, and courtesans rode horseback alongside the king. The Greek philosopher Heracleids also mentions courtesans accompanying the king on horseback during his hunting activities. By contrast, after the fall of the Achaemenid Empire, the pre-Islamic empires (Seleucids, Parthians, and Sassanids) were associated with an upheaval of the social order, and subsequently with external insecurity, which probably led women to privilege activities within the home.

=== Middle Ages ===
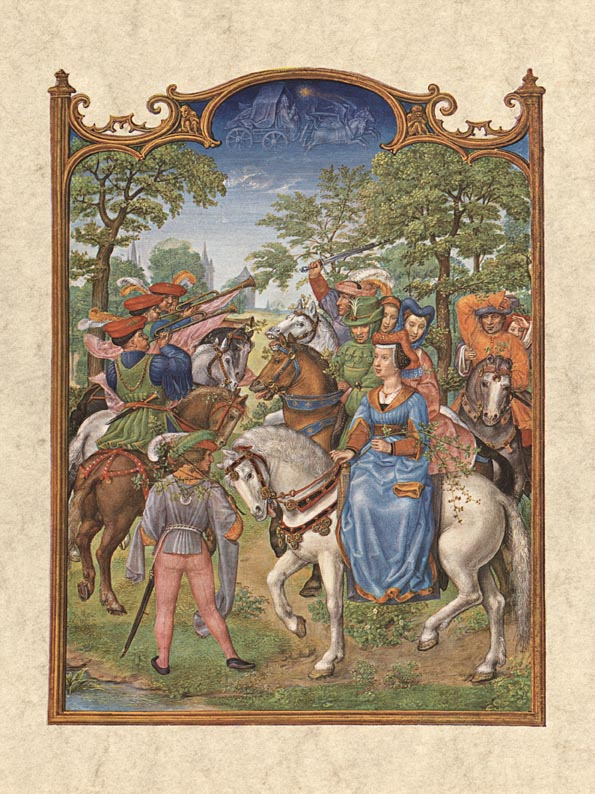
A woman riding sidesaddle, probably Anne of Bohemia (1366–1394) - Gerard Horenbout, 16th century

In China, under the Tang dynasty, a loss of social status for women coincided with the development of equestrianism, as attested by the archaeological discovery of numerous statuettes of riders. Pre-Islamic Persian literature from the 11th century also contains references to women participating in equestrian activities on an equal footing with men.

During the Western Middle Ages, many guilds accepted widows as members, so that they could continue the work of their deceased husbands. Some women worked in horse-related trades. On farms, women frequently worked alongside men, managing draft horses and oxen as part of their duties.

Despite these difficulties, many Western women traveled long distances on horseback in medieval times. High society wives accompanied their husbands to tournaments. Others took on social or family commitments that led them to travel. Nuns and women of faith made pilgrimages. When not on foot, these women generally traveled on horseback (most often on a palfrey, which was more suitable) or, if weak or ill, in a wagon or litter. Women of the nobility sometimes owned horses with which they accompanied men in activities such as hunting and falconry.

Until the 14th century, most women rode astride, with one leg on each side of the horse. Around the 11th century, a model of saddle with a footrest was invented to allow noblewomen to ride sidesaddle, accommodating elaborate dresses. However, this saddle was not universally adopted during the Middle Ages. Another technique for riding a horse in dress consists of sitting sideways on a heavily padded saddle, with both legs dangling along one of the horse's flanks: this type of riding is known as "en séant", "à la fermière" or "à la planchette".

Several Western women took part in wars on horseback, including Joan of Arc, Empress Matilda (who led an army against her cousin Stephen of England, armed and caparisoned) and Stephen's wife, Mathilde de Boulogne, in the 12th century. Equestrian jousting, on the other hand, was reserved exclusively for men.

=== Renaissance and modern times ===
From the end of the Western Middle Ages, European women were progressively forbidden to ride astride a horse, particularly in France. Only sidesaddle riding was allowed. This more technical form of riding required the help of a man to get in and out of the saddle with skirts, keeping women in a state of dependence. According to Catherine Tourre-Malen, "ladies' riding, by reducing women to a limited use of the horse, denies them equal access to the horse which, for centuries, has represented freedom and movement, power and domination". Women were marginalized in their access to equitation, all the more so as, in European society, the horse held, until the beginning of the 20th century, a role as a utilitarian and military animal, associated almost exclusively with men.

The equestrian sports of the Renaissance, inherited from jousting, quintaine, and ring racing, relied more on skill than strength but remained essentially masculine. Equestrian academies designed to train the nobility welcomed women, provided they had a certain level of saddle maintenance, particularly from the 16th to the 18th centuries, in western and south-western France. Warlike activities remained closed to them: although women of the European Renaissance sometimes accompanied huntsmen, they rode special horses reserved for them. Gabriel du Breuil Pompée's equitation treatise (1669) highlighted the "grace" and "beautiful posture" that women should exhibit on horseback.

In Persia under the Sefevid dynasty (1501–1736), women's participation in outdoor activities, including riding, was extremely restricted. During the reign of Shah Tahmasp I (1524–1576), women were strictly forbidden to ride anywhere outdoors and were explicitly discouraged from sitting on a horse or holding the reins. This restriction began to change in the late Safavid period, likely influenced by Western visitors, who observed that courtesans and wealthy women were permitted to drive carriages, and prostitutes rode freely. According to travelers' accounts, Persian horsewomen wore long dresses and veils that covered their entire faces.

=== 18th and 19th centuries ===
In Europe, horses remained the domain of the social elite. However, major voyages of exploration and the colonization of new territories led some women to use horses. In 1890 and 1891, Kate Marsden traveled 11,000 miles (18,000 km) across Russia by train, horse-drawn sledge, horse-drawn basket called a Tarantass, on horseback and by boat. According to Jean-Louis Gouraud, some Ottoman Bashi-bazouk troops were led by women.

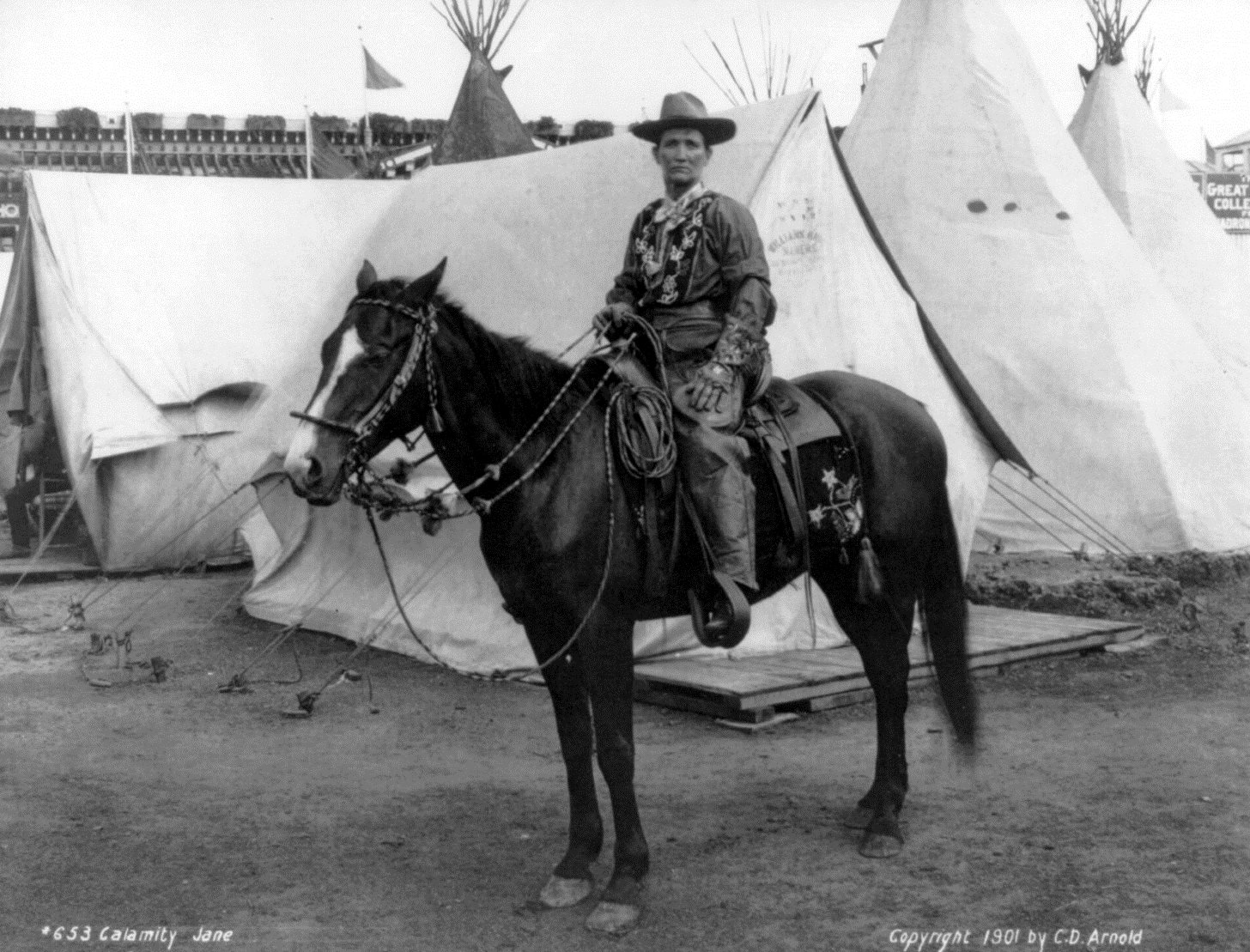
Calamity Jane on horseback, astride

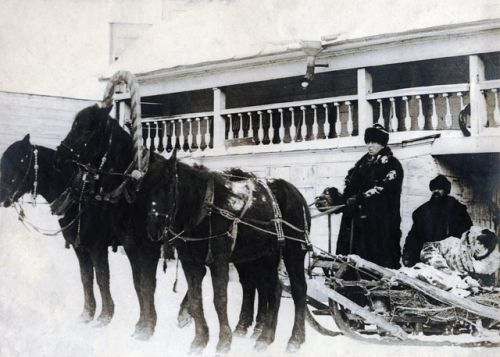
Kate Marsden in a sleigh, Siberia

==== Sidesaddle horsewomen in European circuses ====
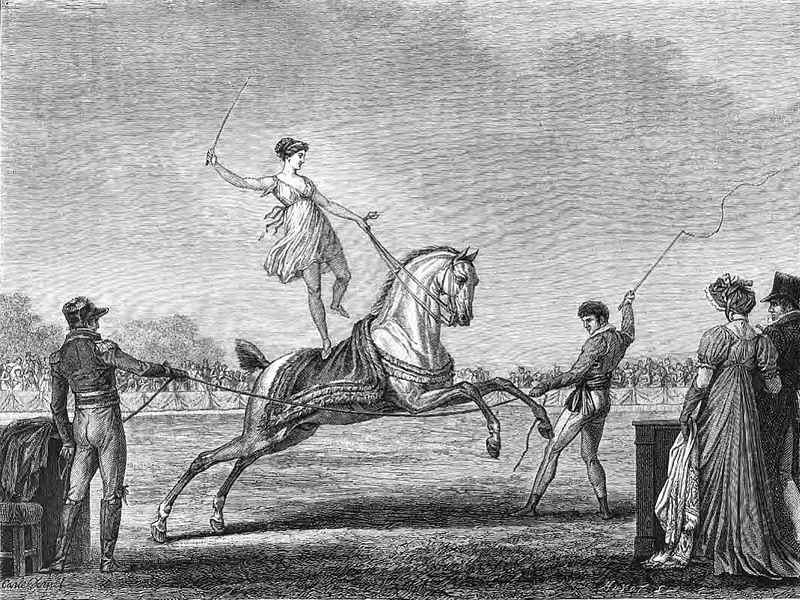
Equestrian exercise at the Franconi circus

During the July monarchy in France, horseback riding was, along with dancing, the only physical activity recommended for the women of Europe's elite. Sidesaddle riding reached its peak in the 19th century.

Despite the restrictions imposed by systematic sidesaddle riding, European women built up a solid reputation in the circus field, becoming renowned horsewomen and attracting large audiences. They were the subject of press articles and inspired artists. The circus offered them an opportunity to assert themselves. These women's acts were so renowned that they traveled with their horses all over Europe, as far away as St. Petersburg. Caroline Loyo, the first female horsewoman to present her high-school horse on a circus ring in 1833, performed at the Cirque d'Hiver in Paris the following year. The Austrian Elisa Petzold became the private teacher of Empress Elisabeth of Austria. By the 1840s, female equestrians outnumbered male equestrians in the circus field. The form of these shows rapidly evolved towards a search for grace and femininity, notably through acrobatic and dance acts.

==== Americas ====
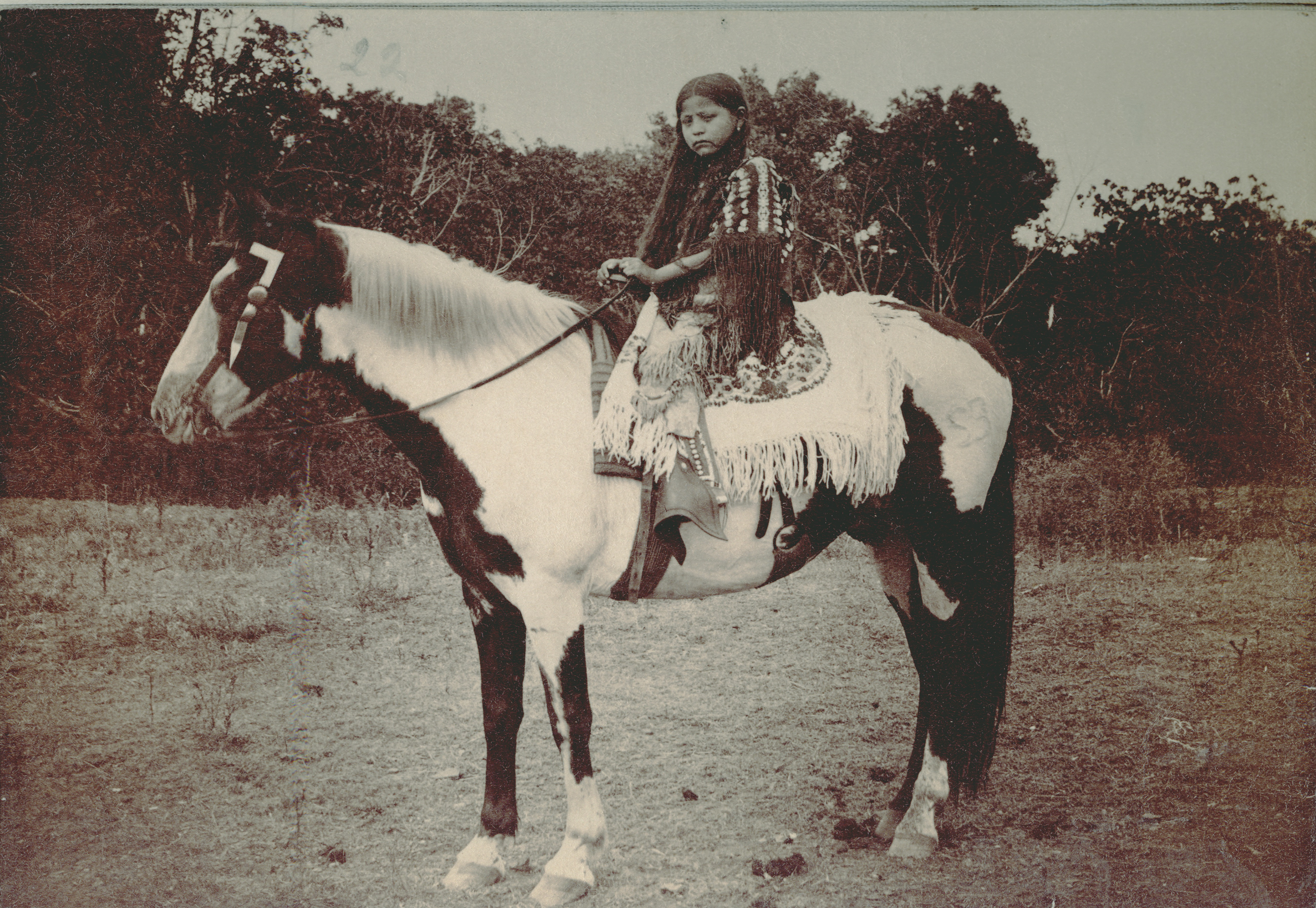
Kiowa girl on horseback, circa 1890-1895

The great diversity of Amerindian tribes precludes generalizations, and studies of their relationship with horses almost always concern men. As sources concerning women are extremely rare, they allow only imprecise reconstructions. The American West is historically described as an ideal space for men and cattle, and "a hell for women and horses". The Native American tribes of the Great Plains initially appear to have been relatively egalitarian in terms of male-female relations. The introduction of the horse to their territory in the 18th century led to cultural and social changes. By the 19th century, tribes like the Lakota and Cheyenne became prominent horse riders. Herding horses became a male activity, and the arrival of horses among these peoples probably favored men in the first instance. A decline in women's social status was evident at the same time; the horse favored warrior raids, a male activity. However, early photographs show Crow women riding astride horses in the early 20th century. There are also records of Cheyenne and Blackfeet women becoming skilled horsewomen, of Crow women riding in the battle against the Sioux, and of an old Pawnee woman riding to defend her village against a Poncas attack.

The conquest of the American West led many women of European origin and of all social statuses to ride horses or drive carriages to get around. In the United States in the late 19th century, Calamity Jane was renowned for riding long distances on horseback, astride like a man.

==== African kingdoms ====
Most of the great pre-colonial African monarchies kept the horse away from women and accepted no women among their military cavalry, with one possible exception: in the Bamoun kingdom, the care of horses was entrusted to rigorously selected young girls, called "Servants of the Horse".

In his 1979 study of the Abisi ethnic group in Nigeria, anthropologist Jean-Jacques Chalifoux notes that women are generally prohibited from owning horses, which are reserved for men, particularly for hunting purposes. Nonetheless, a "horsewoman" is tasked with providing fodder and water for the horses.

==== Ethnic groups in China ====
In his posthumous work La femme en Chine (1876), Louis-Auguste Martin observed that among the "Lo-Lo" ethnic group (better known as the Yi), women rode horses during wedding ceremonies, wearing a long dress topped by a small coat that fell to the waist; they wore the same outfit when they needed to travel on horseback. Diplomat John Barrow, during his service at the English Embassy in Peking (1792–1794), similarly testifies to the fact that Tartar women ride astride horses in the streets wearing long silk dresses, unlike Chinese (Han) women who remain scrupulously at home.

=== 20th century ===
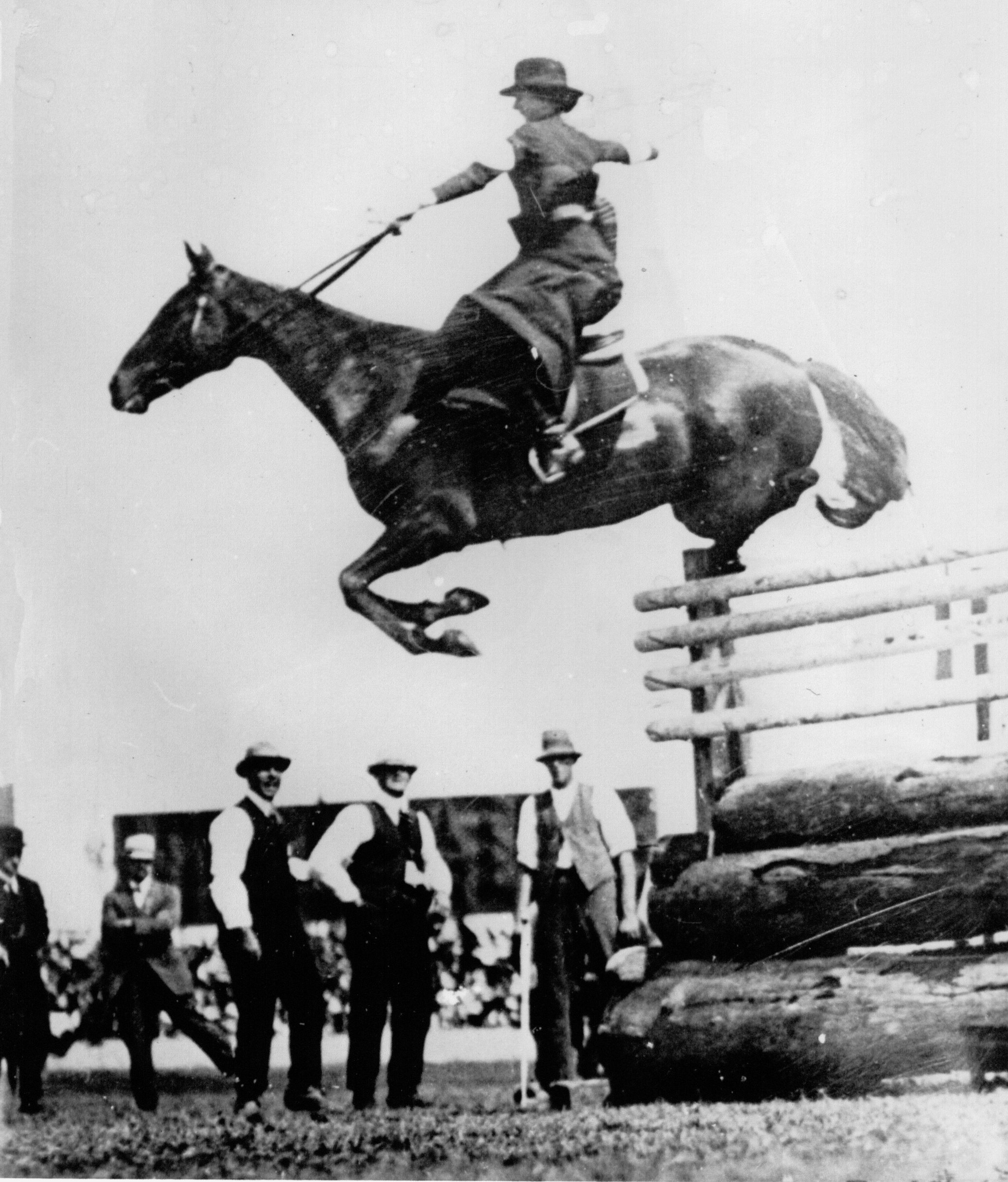
Australian Esther Stace, from Yarrowitch, set a power record by jumping 1.98 m in sidesaddle at the 1915 Sydney Royal Easter Show

In both the UK and Sweden, at the beginning of the 20th century, riding was inextricably linked with men and masculinity, with Swedish riders coming from the upper classes, particularly in the transport and military sectors. A massive feminization of equestrian practices was observed in most European countries, particularly in the UK, as well as in the US, throughout the 20th century. In Latin America, while comprehensive statistics on equestrian practices are lacking, the feminization trend is evident, particularly in show jumping in Brazil. In Canada, rodeo, traditionally a male sport, is attracting more and more women. The same phenomenon can be observed in dressage competitions worldwide. In the United States, Spain, and Brazil, traditional equestrian practices such as western riding and doma vaquera continue to be predominantly male activities.

==== Authorization to ride astride and access to international competitions ====
Authorization for women to ride astride coincided with the wave of feminist protest movements. In 1914, only sidesaddle riding was deemed suitable for French women. In 1930, a French law authorized women for the first time to wear pants when riding horses or bicycles. This rapid shift in mentality appears to be driven by parallel changes in education and social norms, as well as the influence of cultures—particularly American ones—that had already embraced astride riding for all. In 1952, women were allowed to take part in Olympic dressage competitions for the first time, and in 1956, the same authorization was granted for Olympic show jumping competitions. The Swedish press devoted numerous articles to women in equestrian sports during the 1956 Summer Olympics in Stockholm, indicating a relatively rare female presence in this sector at the time. Pat Smythe, the first British woman to compete in Olympic show jumping, received considerable media attention for her participation.

==== Evolution of gender representations ====
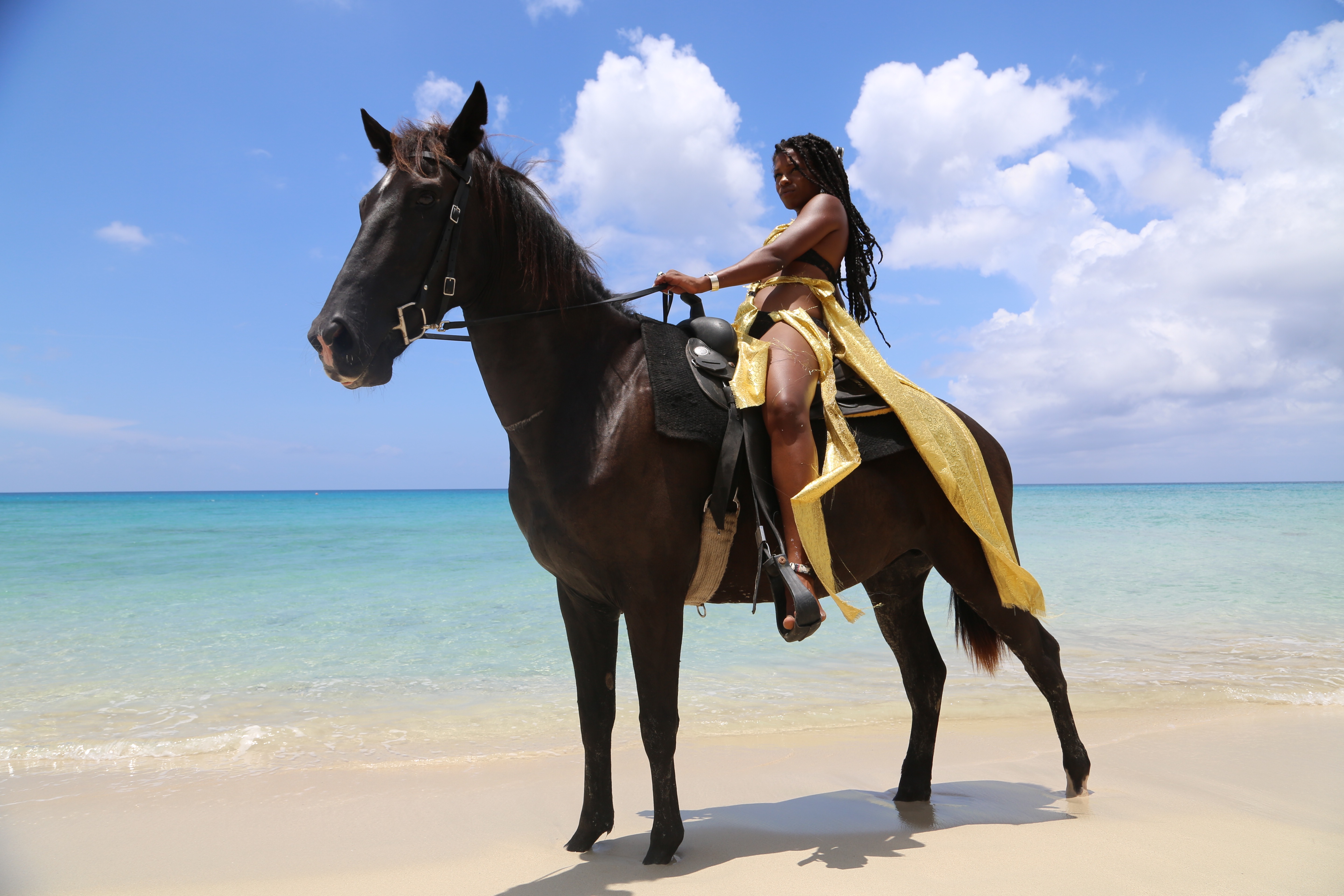
Rider on a beach

According to sports sociologist Susanna Hedenborg from Malmö University, gender representation in horse riding began to shift in Sweden and the UK during the 1950s.

Riding, previously practiced by officers and aristocrats in the Western world, was increasingly attracting women, generally young, urban, and middle-class. As women gained access to sports and leisure activities, the equestrian world became increasingly feminized throughout the 20th century. This cannot be explained simply by the decline in military activities and work with horses.

An analysis of recruitment advertisements published in the British equestrian magazine Horse & Hound reveals a significant change in gender representation. In 1912, no advertisements specifically sought female recruits, but by 1964, nearly 50% of the ads explicitly sought women. This change followed a steady trend: since 1956, women have comprised the majority of riders and grooms recruited through this British magazine. This may be at least partly explained by the loss of many young British men during the Second World War. Additionally, the preference for lighter-weight riders and grooms has influenced this trend.

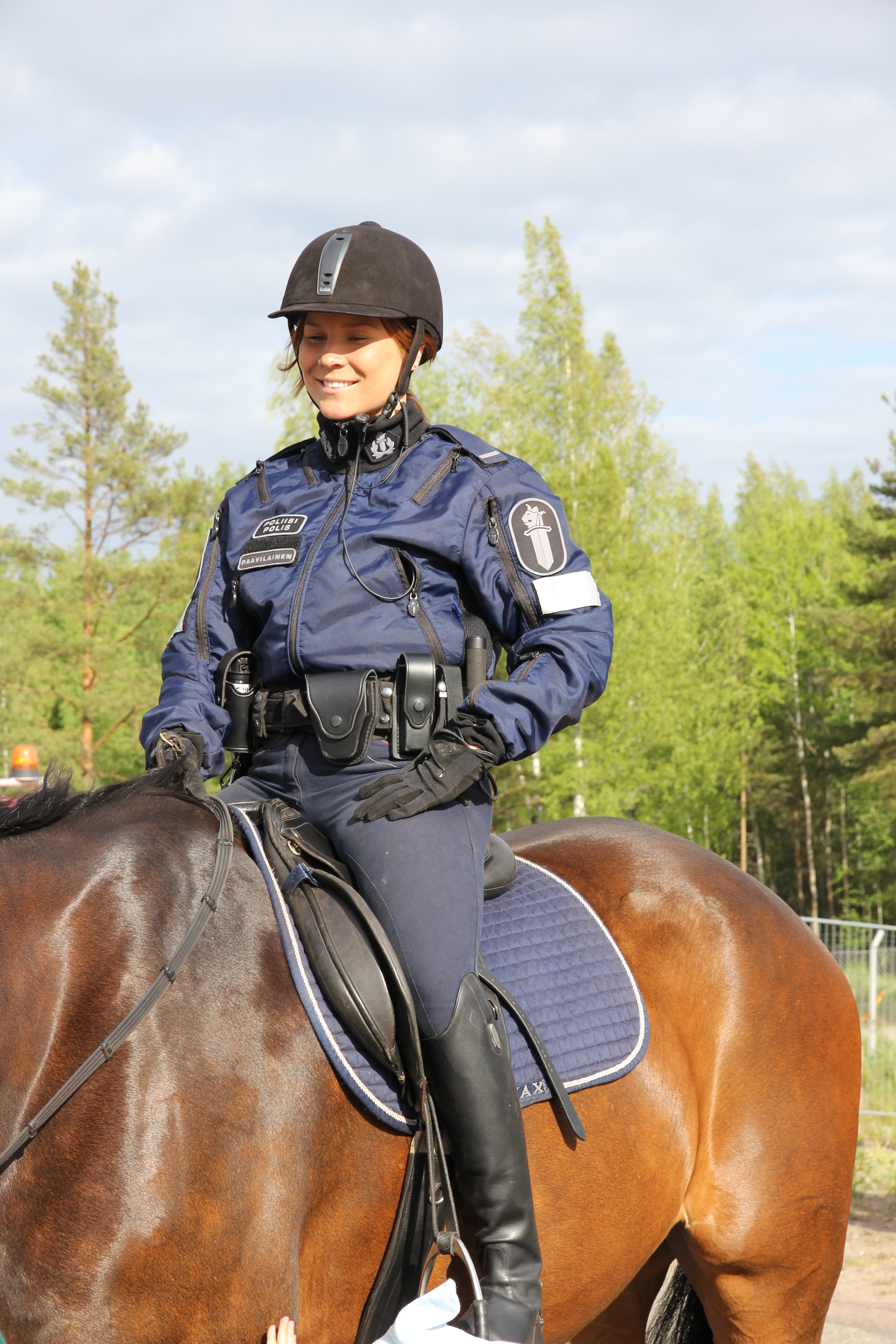
Finnish mounted police, 2015

According to Tourre-Malen, the welcome given to female riders by male riders is often favorable and benevolent, thanks to a gallant tradition, and despite a certain machismo.

And naturally, the number of women jockeys is set to multiply. Until now, what had always held back their proliferation was a psychological problem. Can you imagine a woman jockey slowing down a hundred metres from the finish to apply a little lipstick so she looks her best in the photo finish? - André and Mina Guillois, Les femmes marrantes (1975)

The shift in gender dynamics within equestrian sports became particularly noticeable in the 1970s. During this period, women began to diverge from the traditional model of military and masculine riding. The rise of pony riding played a significant role in this transformation, providing children and young girls with access to smaller, less intimidating animals. In France, the proportion of licensed women riders rose from just over 50% in 1963 to 53.4% in 1975, then to 63.5% in 1987. By the end of the century, women accounted for 70-80% of all riders in France, making the French Equestrian Federation the most feminized of the major Olympic sports federations.

== Myths, heroines and legends ==
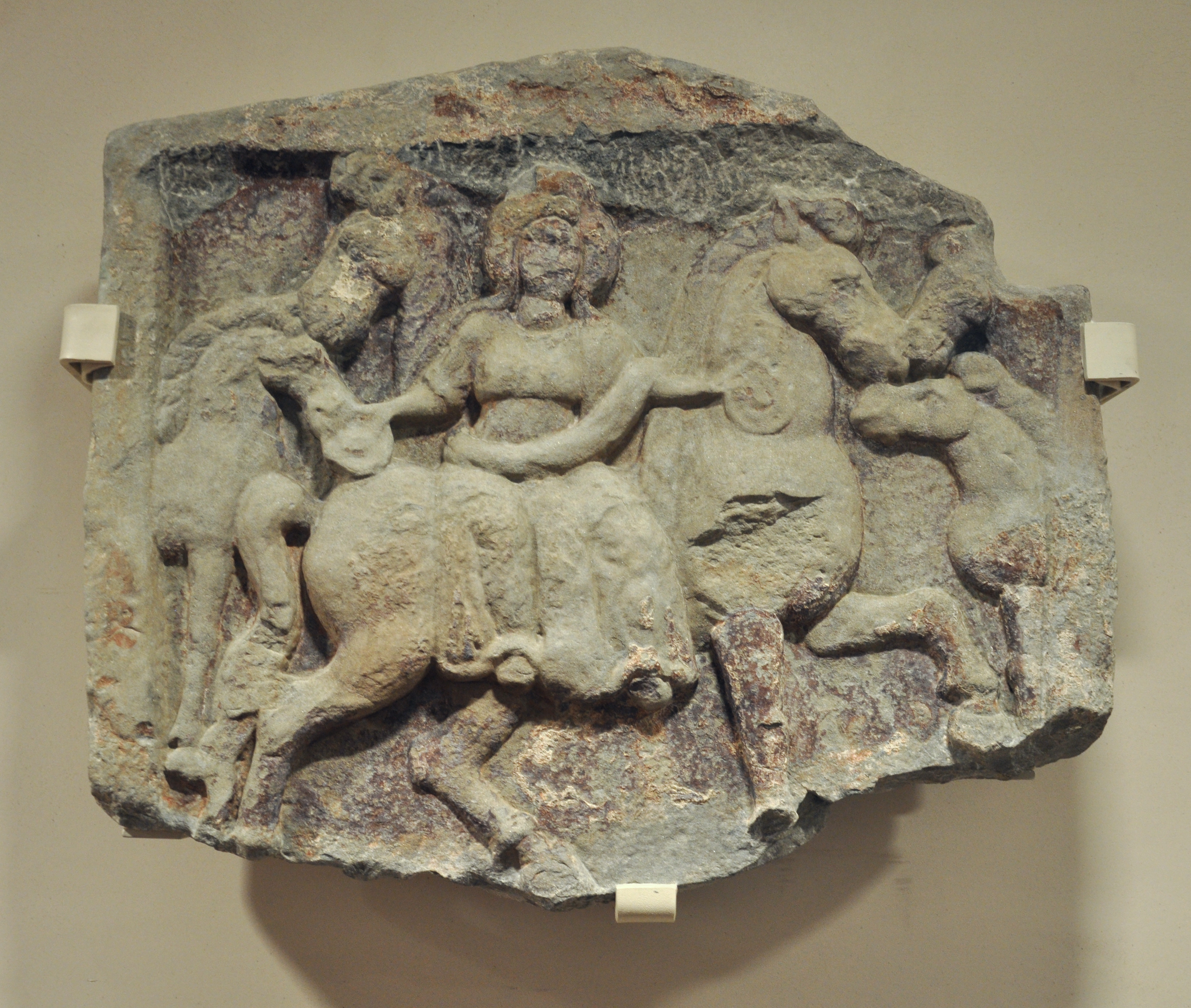
Epona, a Gallic cavalry goddess whose cult was taken over by the Romans

The relationship between women and horses has been evoked in certain great myths and heroic tales since Antiquity. The archetype of the warrior and equestrian heroine appears across many civilizations, including Joan of Arc in France, Hua Mulan in China, and several prominent figures on the African continent.

=== Divinities ===
In his study La femme et l'équidé dans la mythologie française, mythologist George Charrière notes the existence of numerous mythological equestrian figures. These include the goddess Épona, a Gallic deity later adopted by the Romans, and the Irish goddess Rhiannon. Other notable figures are the woman-unicorn associations, the chauchevieille, the Trottes-vieilles of Haute-Saône, and the Franc-Comtoise equestrian fairy Tante Arie. Epona is depicted as a symbol of abundance, with the horn of plenty, which Charrière interprets as a dairy goddess. According to philosopher Michel Cazenave, Celtic mare-goddesses can embody female sovereignty: in Celtic Irish mythology, the goddess Macha wins a foot race against horses.

Persian mythology also includes goddesses and other female figures associated with the horse, including Anāhitā, goddess of water and military woman, who drives a chariot pulled by four horses. In Greek and Roman mythology, the agricultural and fertility goddess Demeter is sometimes depicted with a horse's head.

=== Myth of the Amazons ===
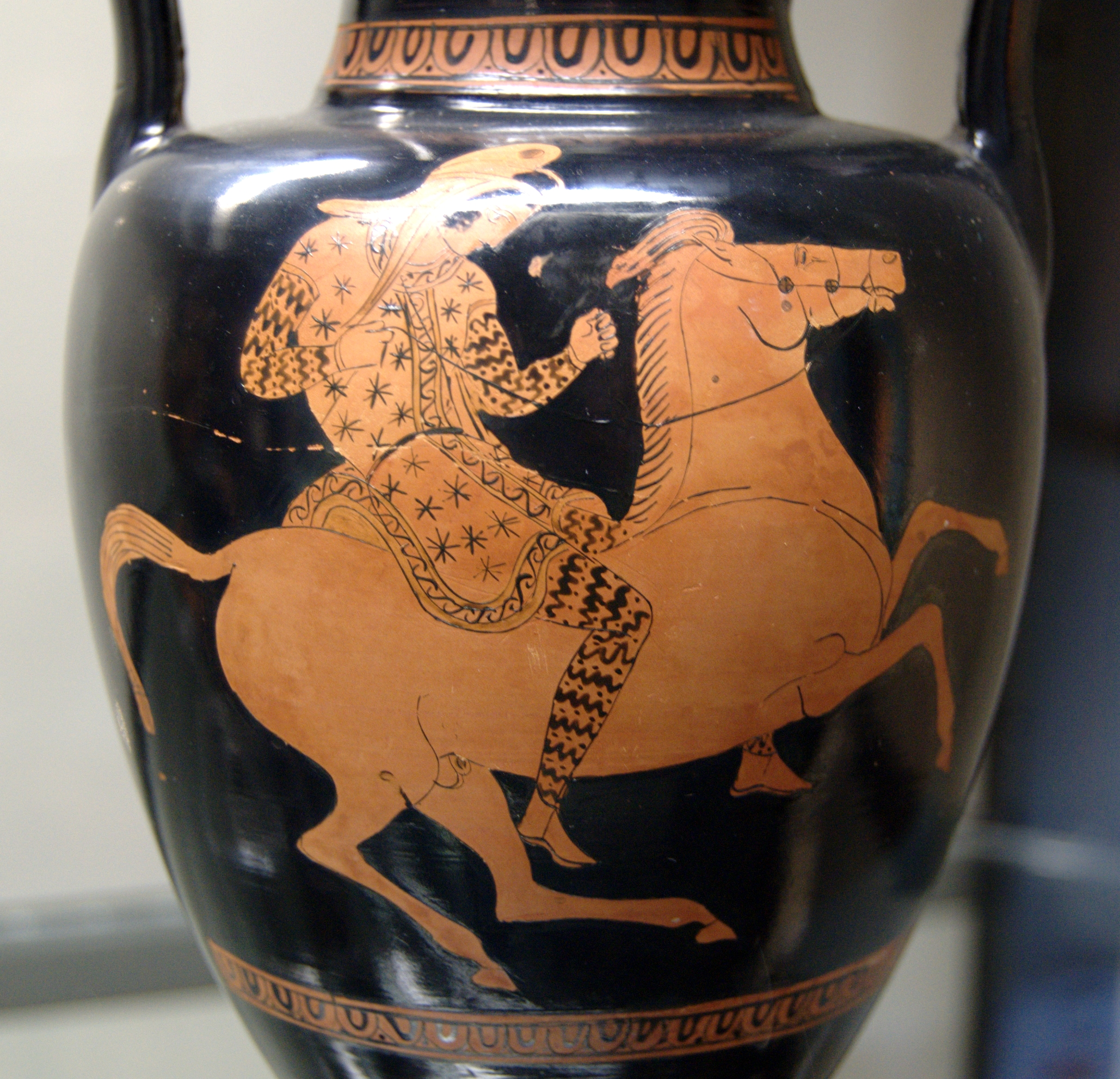
Amazon on horseback, Side B of a red-figured Attic-necked amphora, c. 420 B.C.

The myth of the Amazons is one of the best-known associations between women and the horse, having nourished "representations of women on horseback and matriarchy". They were the first women to use cavalry, organizing themselves into a society in which men were their slaves or outcasts. The name Hippolyta, Queen of the Amazons, means "untied horse" in Greek.

This myth seems to have its roots in the well-documented existence of women riders and warriors in antiquity, seen as extraordinary in ancient Greek patriarchal society, where women had no access to horseback riding. The Amazons became part of the myth that fed the Greek imagination.

=== Heroic African women riders ===
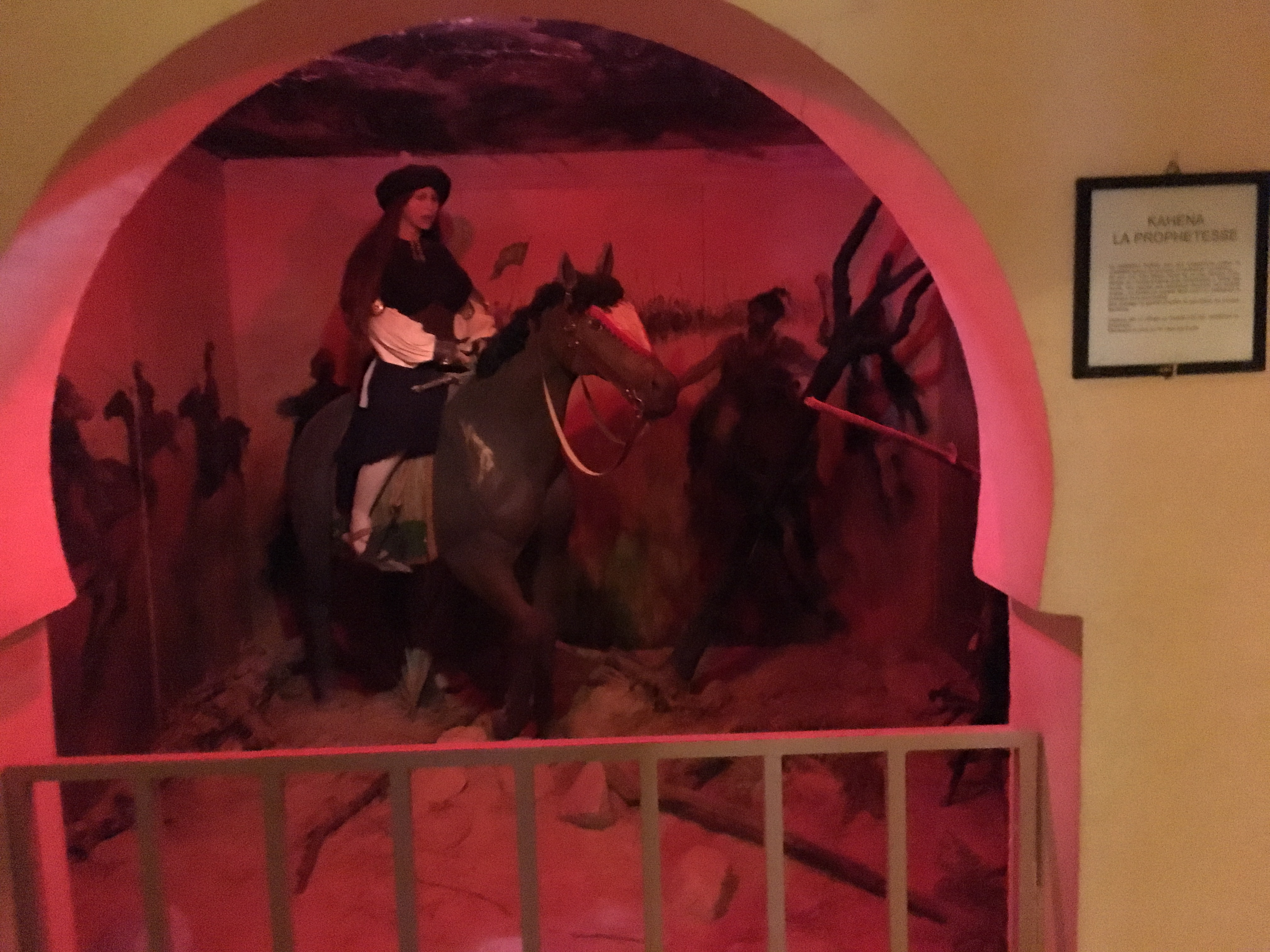
Dihya, shown on horseback at the Dar Cheraït Museum in Tozeur

Many African peoples have equestrian heroines, notably the Berbers and the Sahel.

==== Legendary horsewomen of the Maghreb ====
In the Maghreb region, the legendary queen Dihya, also known as "La Kahina, stands out as a prominent figure. Known for her resistance against Arab expansion in North Africa, Dihya is celebrated for her leadership and bravery.

In his Voyages dans les régences de Tunis et d'Alger, Claude-Charles de Peyssonnel describes how Sultan Bou Aziz was attacked and defeated by Hassan Bou Kemia, the bey of Constantine, in 1724; he was in despair when his daughter, called Elgie Bent Boisis Ben Nacer (Euldjia Bent Bou Aziz Ben Nacer), had her most beautiful clothes brought to her and, having dressed herself, mounted her horse, calling the women and girls, her relatives and friends, who also mounted their horses. She harangued the women, telling them: "Since these men don't dare to go against the Turks, who will soon come and rape us in their eyes, let's go and sell our lives and honor dearly ourselves, and not stay with these cowards any longer". Then, uncovering her throat and showing it to the men, she shouted "Children of Nazer (Nacer)! Whoever wants to suck this milk, follow me! The men, stung by the girl's heroism, attacked the Turks with such violence that they defeated the camp, took part of the booty that had been taken from them, took the Khalifa prisoner, and stripped all the Turks.

==== Legendary Sahel horsewomen ====
The Sahel Sarraounia horsewoman is a figure reinvented romantically in the 1980s, presented as a woman raised like a man in a patriarchal society. Soninke chivalry is said to have been created by Niamey, another Sahelian horsewoman who is evoked in the legendary tales of the griots when she became a rider at a very young age, a winged horse rising from the sky placed itself at her service.

Yennenga, whom Jean-Louis Gouraud likens to "Africa's Joan of Arc", is a princess of great beauty and a skilled horsewoman who falls in love with the hunter Riale while riding his stallion; her son takes the name Ouedraogo, meaning "the stallion", in homage to his mount: he is the ancestor and founder of the Mossi ethnic group. Yennenga is also featured on the FESPACO awards, known as "stallion".

== Economic analysis ==
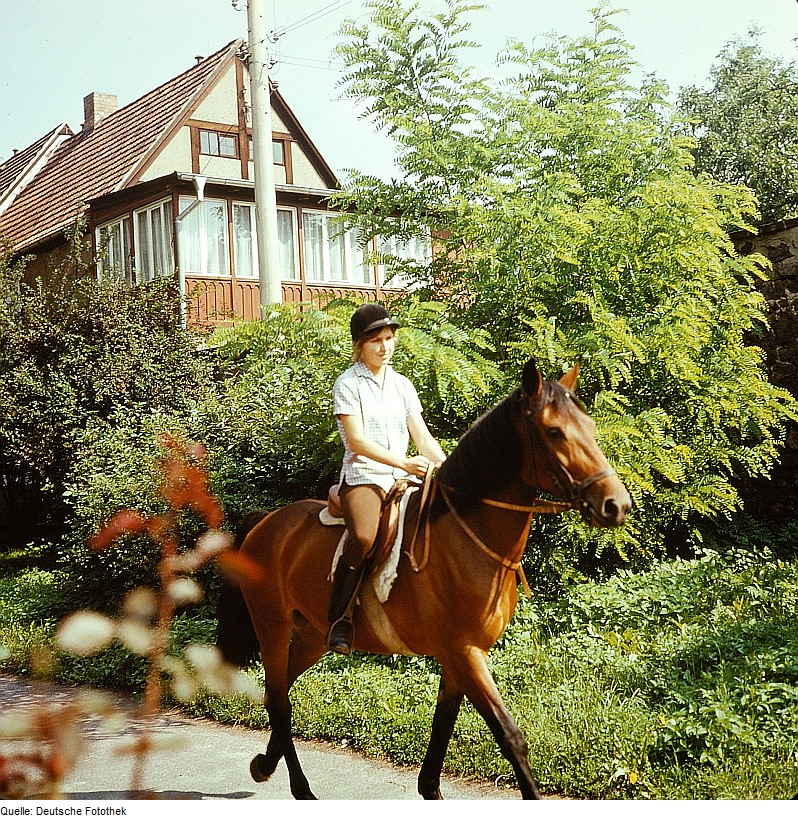
German rider in 1977

In 2007, 84% of the members of the Swedish Equestrian Federation were women, most of them young. The sector is also of great economic importance in this country, as riding is practiced by all social classes. The same is true of the UK, where the equestrian sector is the country's leading sports employer.

In the United States, over 80% of equestrians were women as of 2003. In French-speaking Belgium, riding is the fourth most practiced sport overall and the leading women's sport as of 2016.

=== Distribution of activities ===
In France, women accounted for 74.5% of competitors in the French Equestrian Federation in 2006, but only 25% of competitors at the highest level, the "pro" level. Women are predominantly involved in teaching beginners, administration, and horse care. Strategic and high-level roles, including those in professional riding, are more likely to be occupied by men. The dynamics of couples working in equestrian sports often favor the male partner, with women frequently taking on supportive roles rather than leading roles.

Women involved in high-level competition generally have considerable financial capital, enabling them to access high-performance horses and free themselves from domestic chores, or come from well-known professional riding families.

=== Equestrian clothing and equipment ===
According to Tourre-Malen, since the 1930s, Western women riders have adopted the same dress code as men, with little to differentiate them. However, women riders' outfits have become more "feminine" since the 1970s, notably with the arrival of the more comfortable tight-fitting elastic breeches around 1975. The evolution of women's riding gear reflects a market catering to female preferences, with increasing attention paid to aesthetics and comfort.

Tourre-Malen notes that riding is a pretext for women to "adorn themselves", choosing the elements of their outfit and those of the horse's harness with care. While competitive riding still adheres to strict dress codes, particularly in high-level competitions, pony and amateur events offer greater freedom in dress. For Tourre-Malen, "the feminine expression of the outfit can also be seen in the diversification of color ranges for riding breeches and shirts", and equipment manufacturers are targeting this clientele by offering "trendy colors".

Equestrian equipment in &quot;feminine&quot; colors

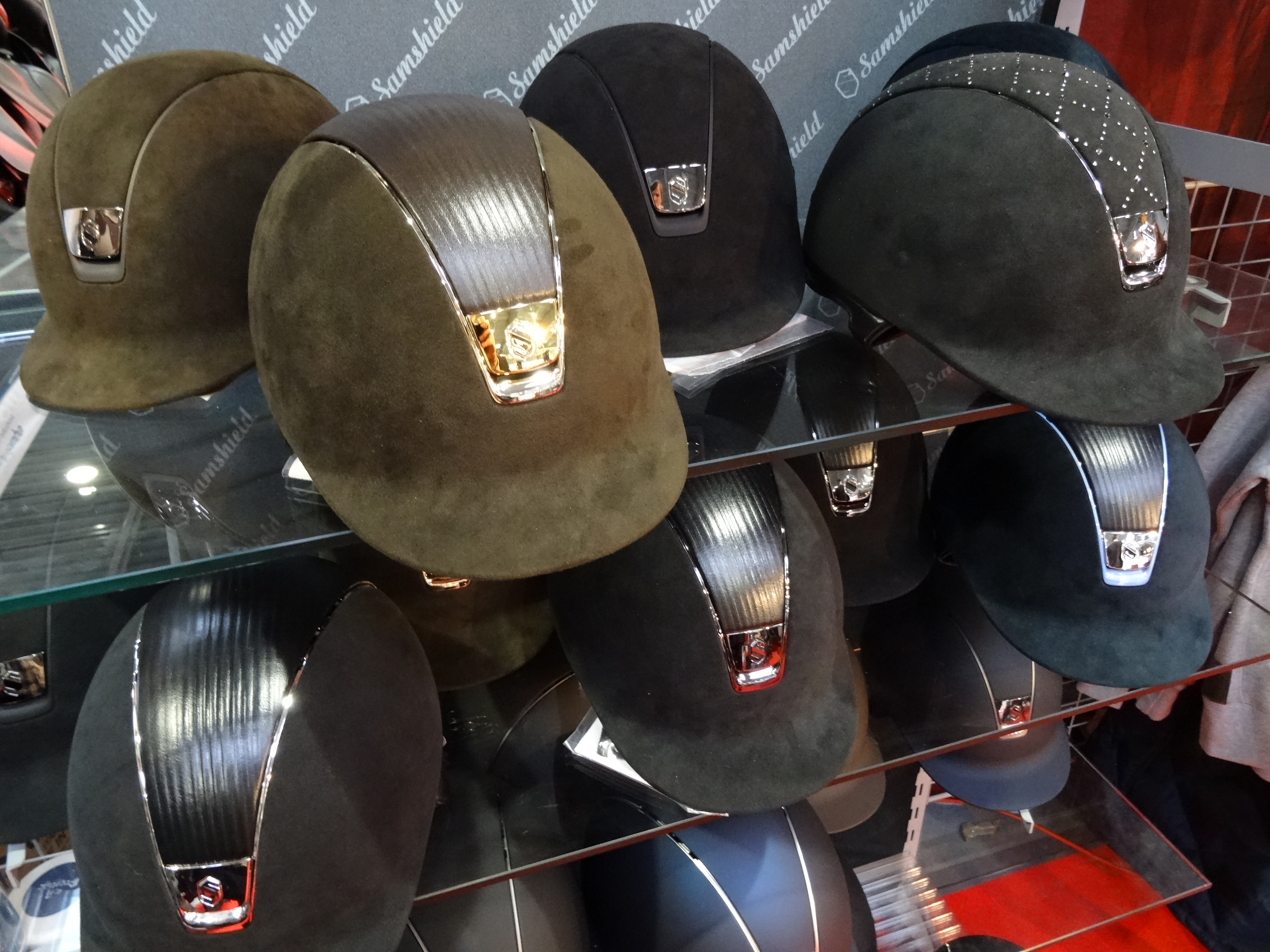
Equestrian helmet covered with shiny lines.

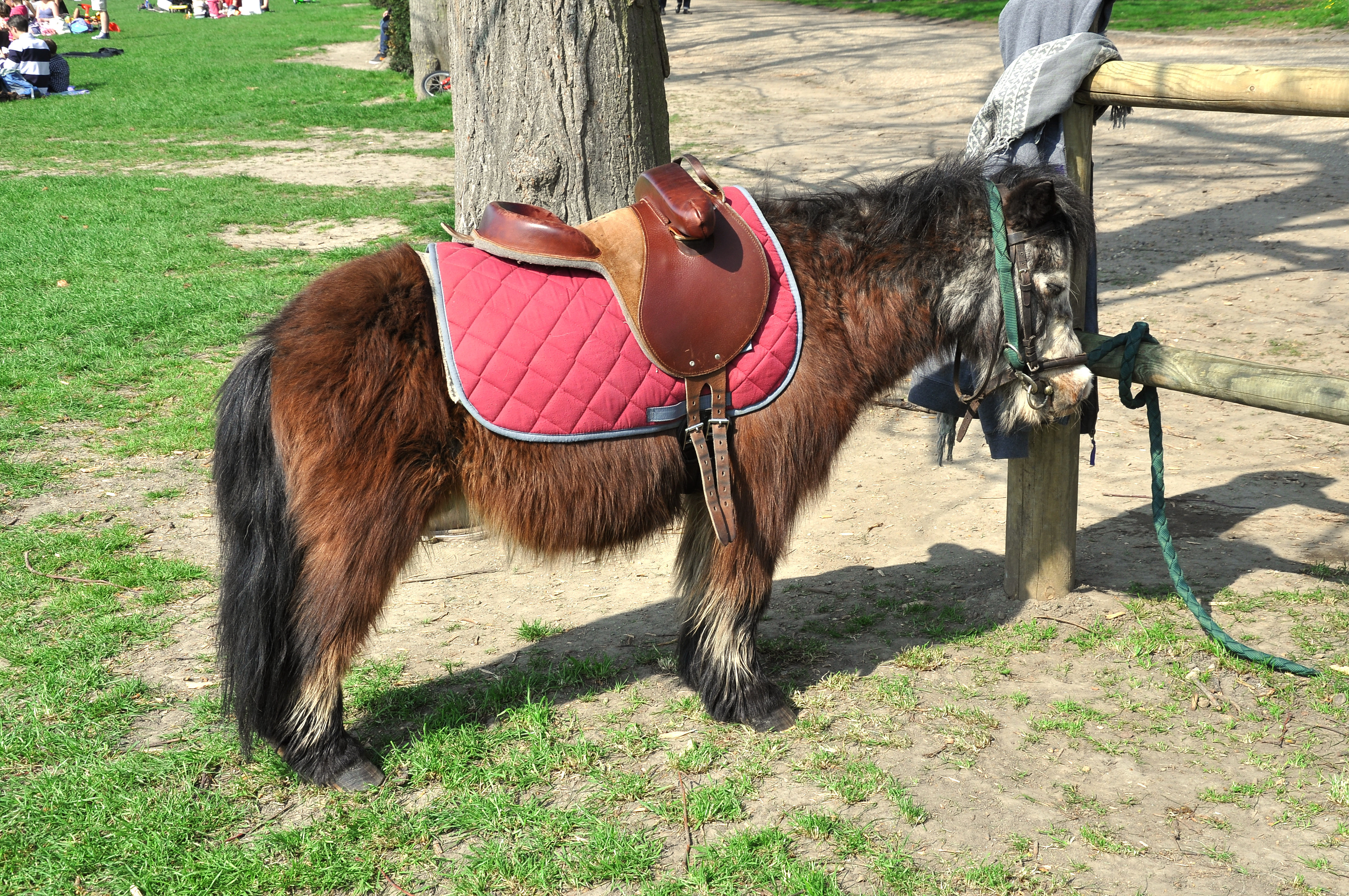
Salmon-pink saddle blanket on a pony in Versailles.

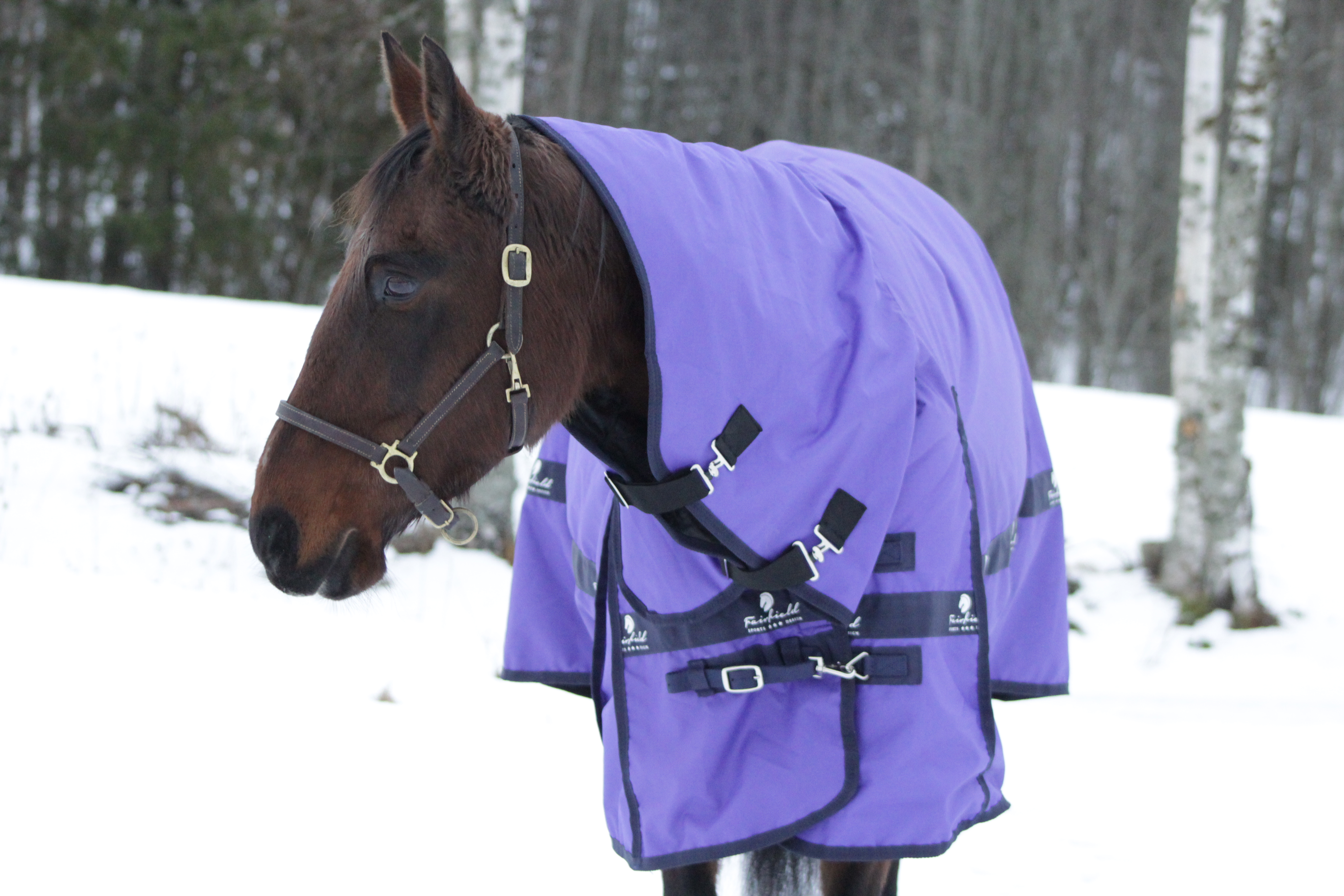
Brightly colored blanket.

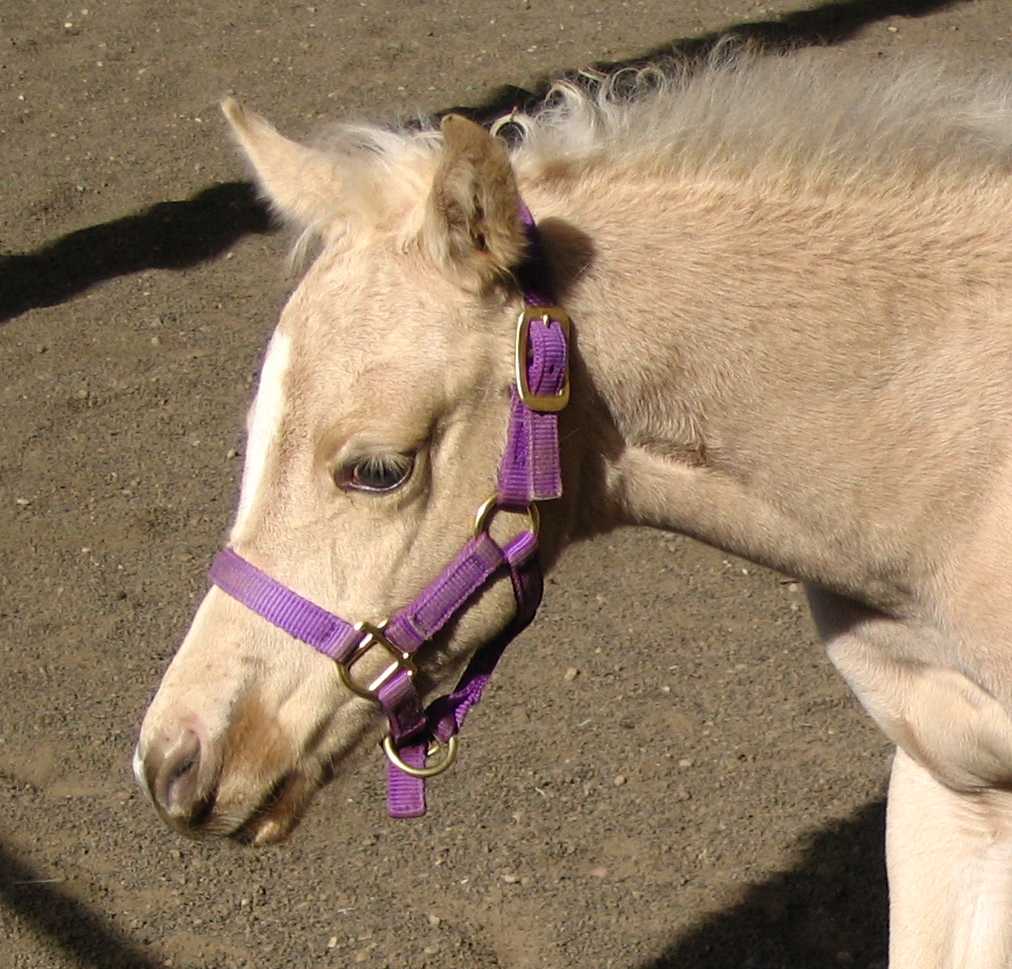
Impoverished halter

The feminization of equestrian practices in the West is reflected in the evolution of equestrian equipment and attire. As noted by Soraya Ghali, the shift from traditional, muted colors like black, brown, green, and navy blue to vibrant and flashy shades such as pink, mauve, neon green, and fuchsia pink highlights a broader trend toward personalization and aesthetic expression in the sport.

These eye-catching colors cover all the modern equestrian equipment used by young riders, especially saddle pads, grooming boxes, breeches, jackets, the front of the bridle (which can be covered with rhinestones), shock-absorbing pads, fetlock guards, bells, and even Equestrian helmet, which can be covered in suede or shiny lines. This evolution is encouraged by equipment manufacturers, who take advantage of the fact that riders' parents spend money on this type of equipment.

== Sociological analysis ==
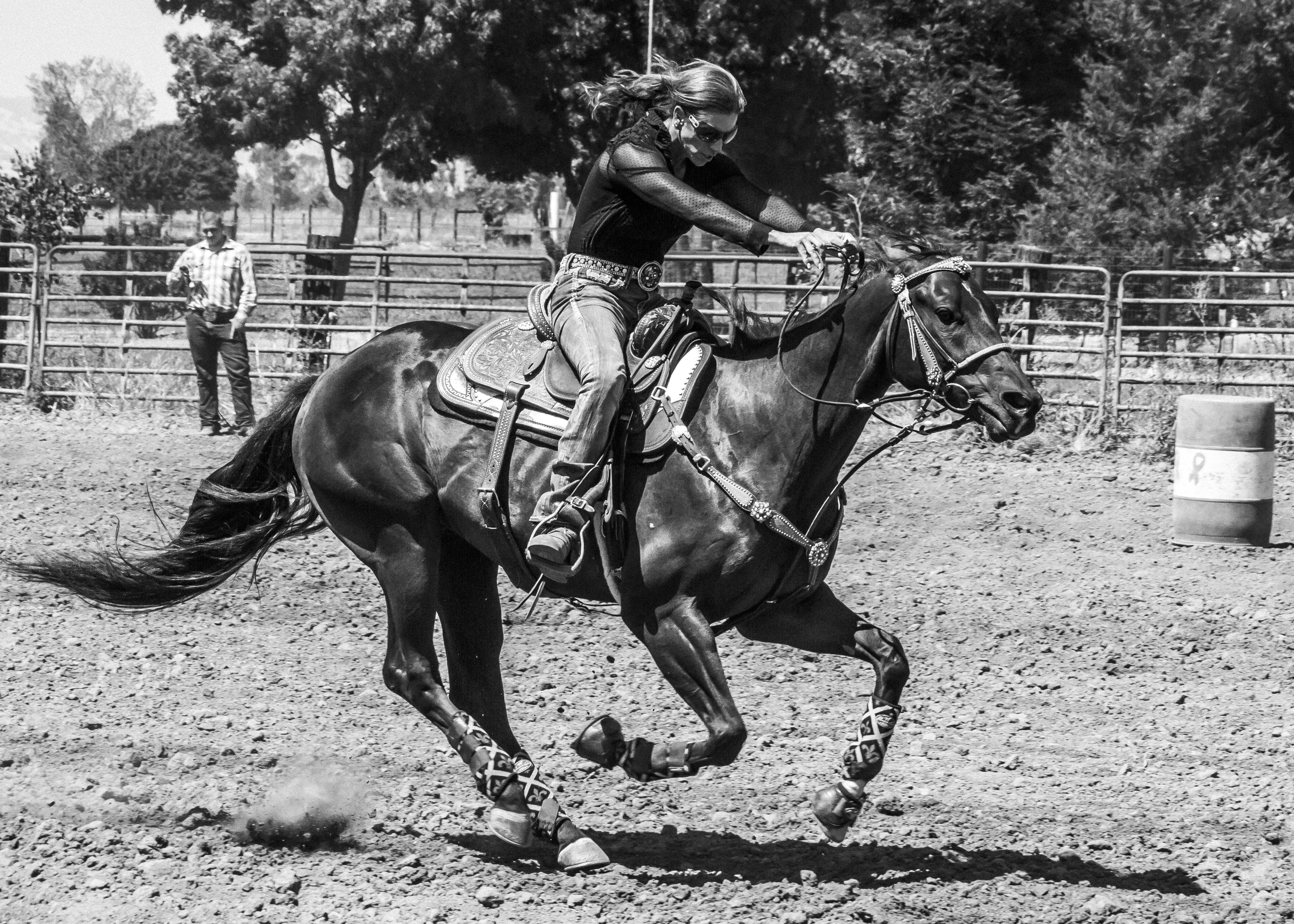
Cowgirl at full gallop

Various studies indicate that female riders often have a strong emotional connection with the horse itself, while male riders tend to focus more on the technical aspects of riding and the associated skills. Catherine Tourre-Malen identifies two gendered profiles in Western equestrianism: a utilitarian male profile and a non-utilitarian female profile, which tends to view the horse more as a companion or pet. According to Tourre-Malen, horse riding has inherent characteristics that "predispose it to feminization," including its elegance and the emphasis on body carriage.

=== In the Western world ===
Despite the feminization of equestrian practices in the Western world, a notable divide persists between the male-dominated sphere of high-level competition and the predominantly female-dominated realm of leisure riding. Jean-Pierre Digard explains the arrival of women in the equestrian world by the fact that they have more free time than men, and that it is more difficult for women to enter the job market. A social divide persists, with women from the poorest Western backgrounds lacking the financial means to ride. This feminization of equestrian practices cannot be explained solely by the loss of the horse's military and utilitarian functions. Catherine Tourre-Malen suggests that the association of horsemanship with elegance and posture, which is culturally linked to femininity, plays a role. In France, particularly, horses are also seen as the favorite animals of young girls.

Digard observes that women's participation in equestrian sports tends to increase with higher socioeconomic status. He also points to a desire among women to challenge and "conquer" a field traditionally dominated by men, which is often perceived as "fundamentally macho" or even misogynistic. Additionally, he posits that women's "animal sensibility" may foster a more nurturing relationship with horses.

Tourre-Malen predicts that the trend towards feminization in equestrian sports will continue, with the practice becoming increasingly associated with women as boys may abandon it to differentiate themselves. In the UK, as in Sweden and other Northern European countries, a boy's interest in riding can be seen as an indication of femininity, similar to ballet. However, the perception of expertise remains associated with men. According to Fanny Le Mancq, this difference can be explained both by a "gendered distribution" of work and by the culture and relationship with the horse, which remain very masculine in top-level competition. Female competitors are frequently the victims of discrimination and denial of their talent, especially if they compete as amateurs. Those who come from riders' families suffer from the status of "wife of" or "daughter of", which reinforces their dependence on men.

Catherine Tourre-Malen believes that "women will perhaps civilize the relationship with the horse to the point of rendering abhorrent the idea of exploiting an animal solely for the pleasure of the rider".

=== In Iran, Saudi Arabia and the Maghreb ===
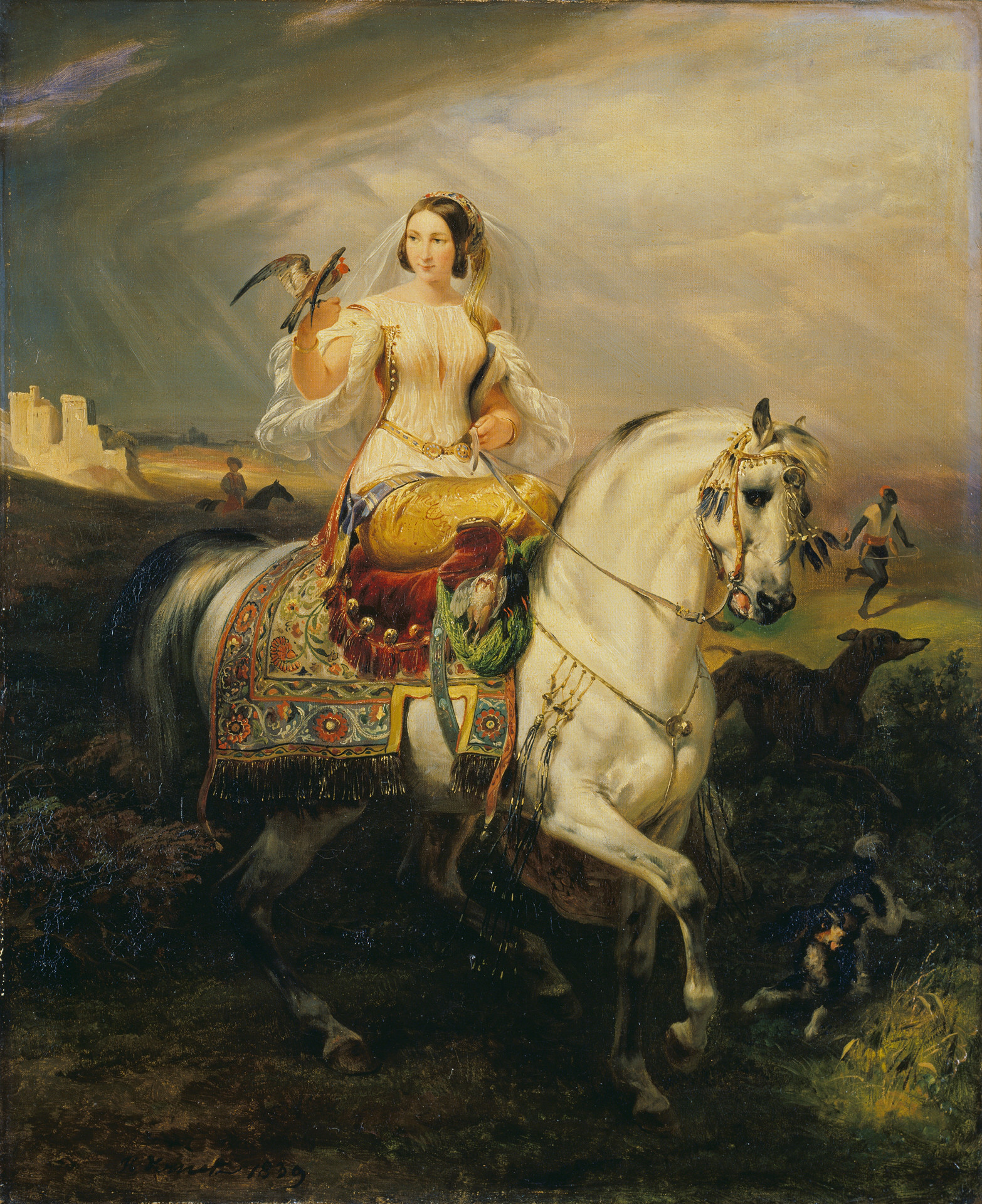
Algerian woman during a falcon hunt, Horace Vernet, 1839

According to sociology professor Ladan Rahbari from the University of Amsterdam, horse-riding in Iran is largely male-dominated ("hegemonic"), and the patriarchal, macho context means that the presence of women is strongly discouraged in sports establishments. There has been little support for horse-riding since the Islamic revolution of 1979; nevertheless, a few women practice leisure riding in Tehran, which is expensive and therefore only accessible to the wealthy social classes. Leisure riding clubs in Iran are unusual in that they allow both men and women to share the same spaces, although women are required to cover their heads.

In Saudi Arabia, there is a persistent belief that women who ride can lose their virginity, which has given rise to the belief that women should never ride horses.

Ethnologist and anthropologist Béatrice Lecestre-Rollier of Université Paris-Descartes notes that in the High Atlas region, women "may follow a mule ridden by a man on foot; they may ride behind a man; if they are old, ill or pregnant, they may ride on the back of a mule, with their son or husband leading it on foot. But it is exceptional to come across a woman alone in the saddle, proud rider". Similarly, the presence of a woman riding alone in the streets of Tizi Ouzou is considered a "very unusual" phenomenon in Algeria in 2020.

=== Among equestrian peoples ===
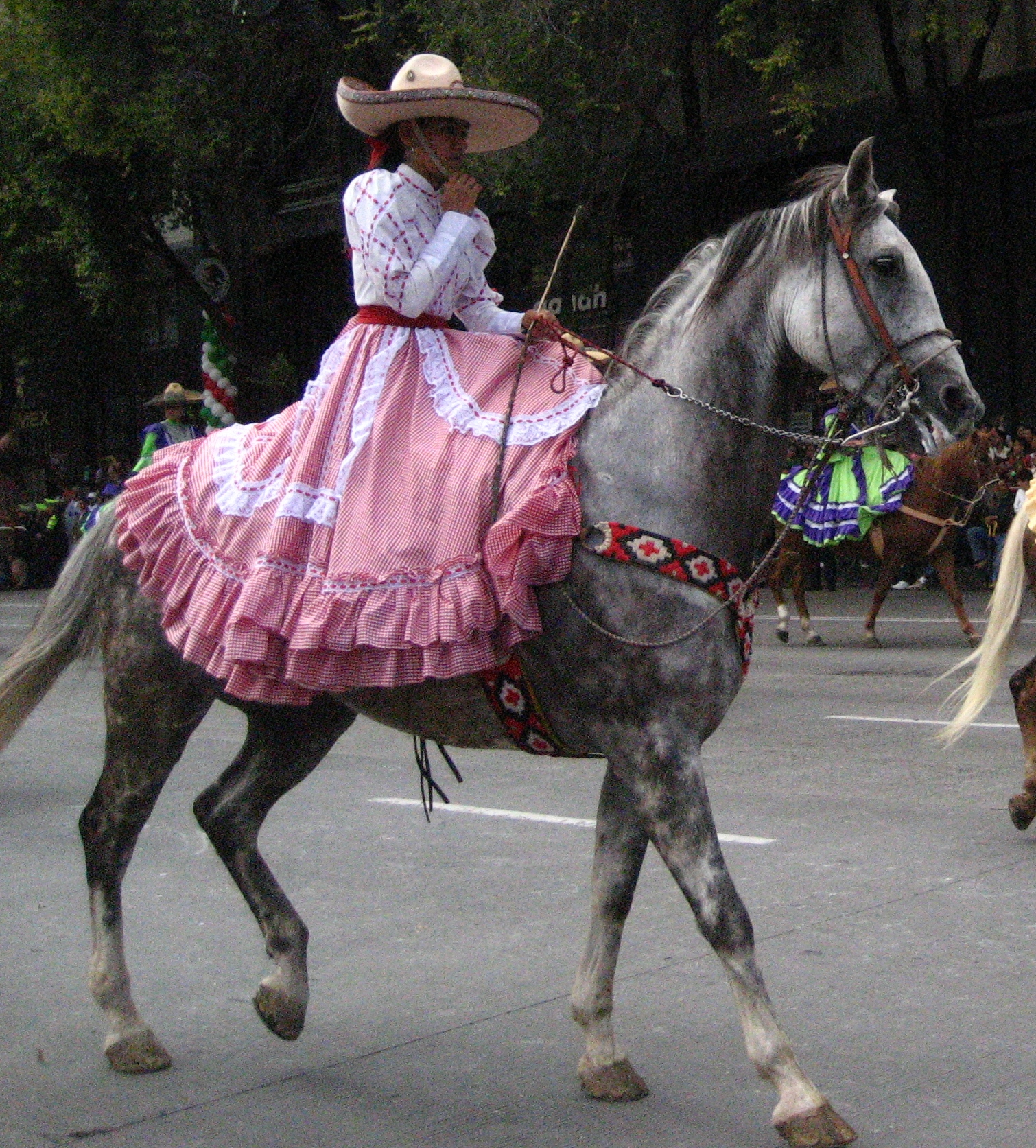
Charra, Mexican chavalier

In regions characterized by a pastoral society, such as Yakutia, the feminization of horse riding is either non-existent or much less marked than in Western countries. The predominant imagery of Argentine gauchos and American cowboys, perpetuated by numerous Western films, highlights the almost exclusively masculine association with horses in these cultures.

==== African beliefs associating women and horses ====
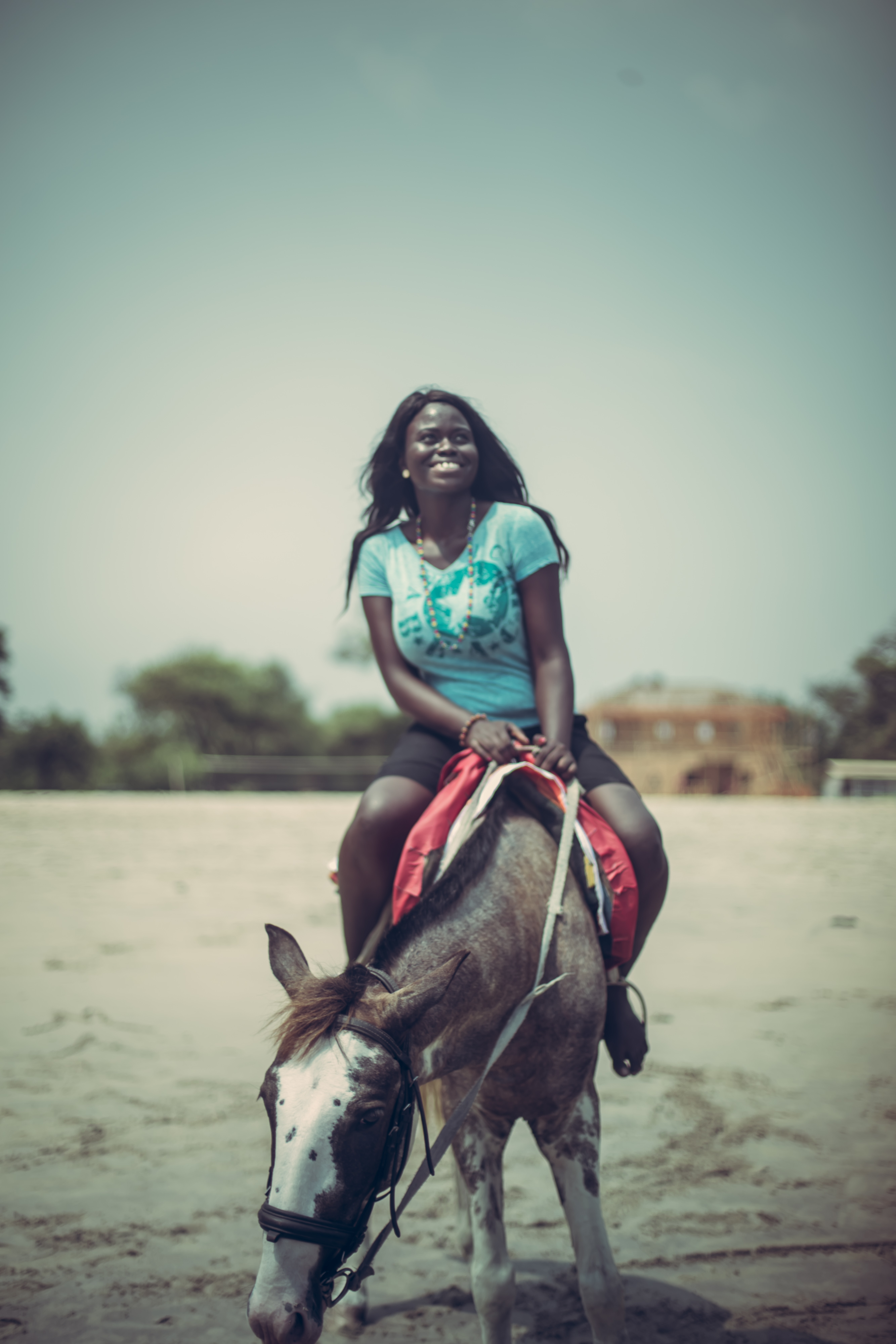
Ghanaian rider with her horse

In Africa, various beliefs surround women who interact with horses. Malian storyteller Amadou Hampâté Bâ notes that a horse suffering from severe colic can be cured if stepped on by a woman who is loyal to her husband. The "horse-woman", who feeds these animals among the Abisi of Nigeria (1979), has the reputation of being able to influence the horse by asking it to disobey its male rider; this power is recognized by the Abisi men, who declare that they avoid any dispute with the horse-woman before mounting their horse. In Guinea, the horse is essentially a symbol of power, cited in folk tales where it is often protective of girls. In the North Guinean tale La fille qui veut soigner son père (The girl who wants to heal her father), her father's horse, named Fanta, is gifted with speech and gives her advice that enables her to retrieve a remedy for her father, disguised as a man. Teli Boumbali's Badiaranké tale Une fille et son mari serpent (A Girl and Her Snake Husband) features Ngololobaabasara, a small horse gifted with speech and metamorphosis, who advises a woman, enabling her to do what usually only men can do.

==== Nomadic peoples of Central Asia ====
Nomadic populations in Iran have likely always practiced mixed equestrian transport, using horses for their annual migrations, which implies that women rode alongside men during these periods. However, hunting is more commonly pursued by Qashqai men than by women. Nomadic Turkmen and Qashqai women are also responsible for managing horse care.

Among the Turkmen, horse-racing is a predominantly male activity, with female participation limited to an essentially ceremonial role; however, efforts are being made to perpetuate the ceremonial role of women riders.

According to sociologist Veronika Velt (2001), in Kalmyk patriarchal society, horses are mainly ridden by men, with restrictions on women. They are not allowed to saddle their horses or get on and off the saddle on their own, these tasks being assigned to a man. The creation of objects from horsehair and sinew, on the other hand, is reserved for women, whose expertise in making lassos from horsehair is highly esteemed.

==== Siberian Yakuts ====
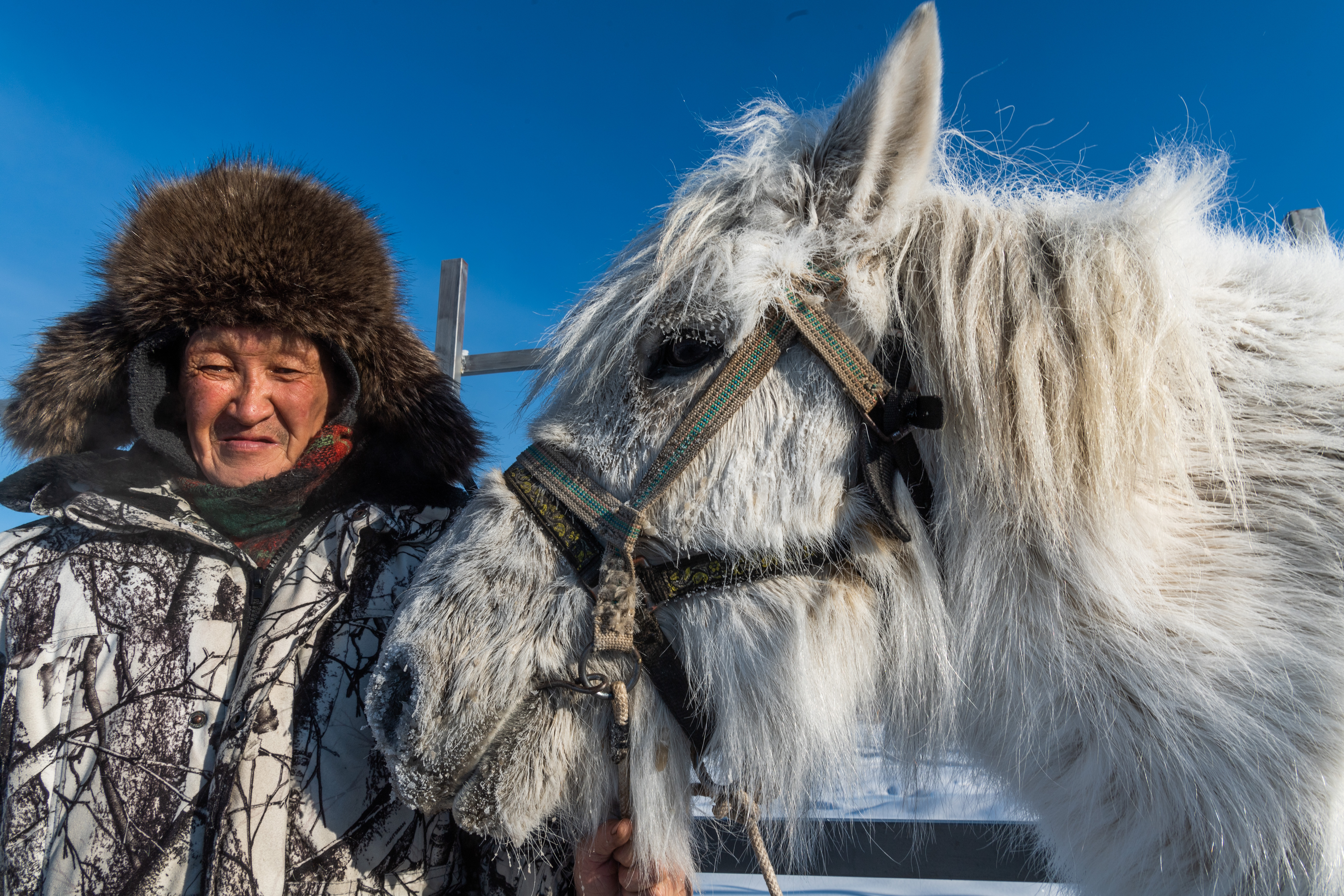
Rider in Oimiakon

According to sociologist Émilie Maj, in Yakutia, women, who are associated with the household, are only in contact with the horses during the milking period, and may look after orphaned foals. Moreover, the protective spirit of horses, D'öḥögöj, is also that of men, but not of women. During the Yḥyah festival, the shaman asks D'öḥögöj to give birth to new foals. During the džalyn "passion" rite, the spirit gives sexual desire to the women, who throw themselves at the shaman "like raging mares at a stallion", neighing in unison with the shaman.

==== Gauchos of South America ====
In South America, the Gauchos represent a distinct equestrian culture characterized by a strong masculine identity that glorifies values such as honor, freedom, righteousness, bravery, and masculinity. Latin American historian John Charles Chasteen testified (in 1995) that there are no women among the Guaraní gauchos.

In Brazilian society, Gauchos are traditionally depicted as virile horsemen, while women are portrayed as delicate and domestic. Since the 2000s, women have been allowed to participate in Brazilian rodeo competitions. However, this inclusion is accompanied by measures designed to keep them "within the bounds of normative femininity".

==== Manadiers de Camargue (France) ====
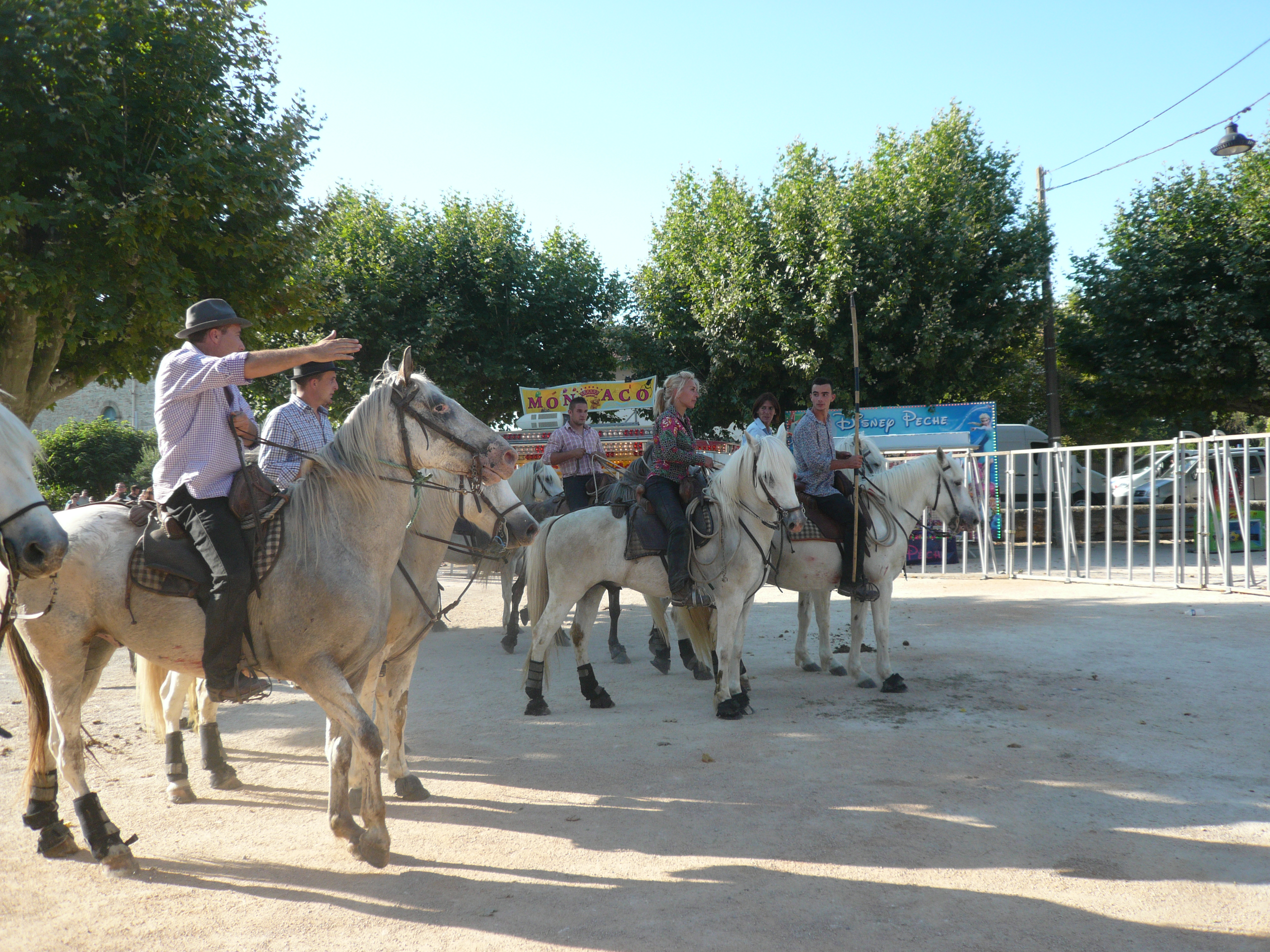
Manadière in the Camargue (middle, background).

Sociologist Sophie Vignon has studied the place of women who arrived in the Camargue manades from the 1980s onwards, in a traditionally masculine environment. These women, who often preferred activities perceived as typically masculine during their childhood, inherited manades or became manadières thanks to their spouse, and a masculine or similar sport. They adopt men's codes in their work and reject "fragile" women while trying to retain their femininity.

==== Sumbanese from Indonesia ====
On the Indonesian island of Sumba, as of 2018, men and children provide food for the horses, while women supply the water. According to Indonesian researchers Melkianus D. S. Randu from the Department of Animal Husbandry at the Agricultural Polytechnic of the Principality of Kupang and B. Hartono from the Faculty of Animal Husbandry at the University of Brawijaya, Malang, horses are culturally associated with men and symbolize responsible masculinity. Women typically manage horse breeding only if they inherit the family business or if their husbands pass away.

=== Competitions ===
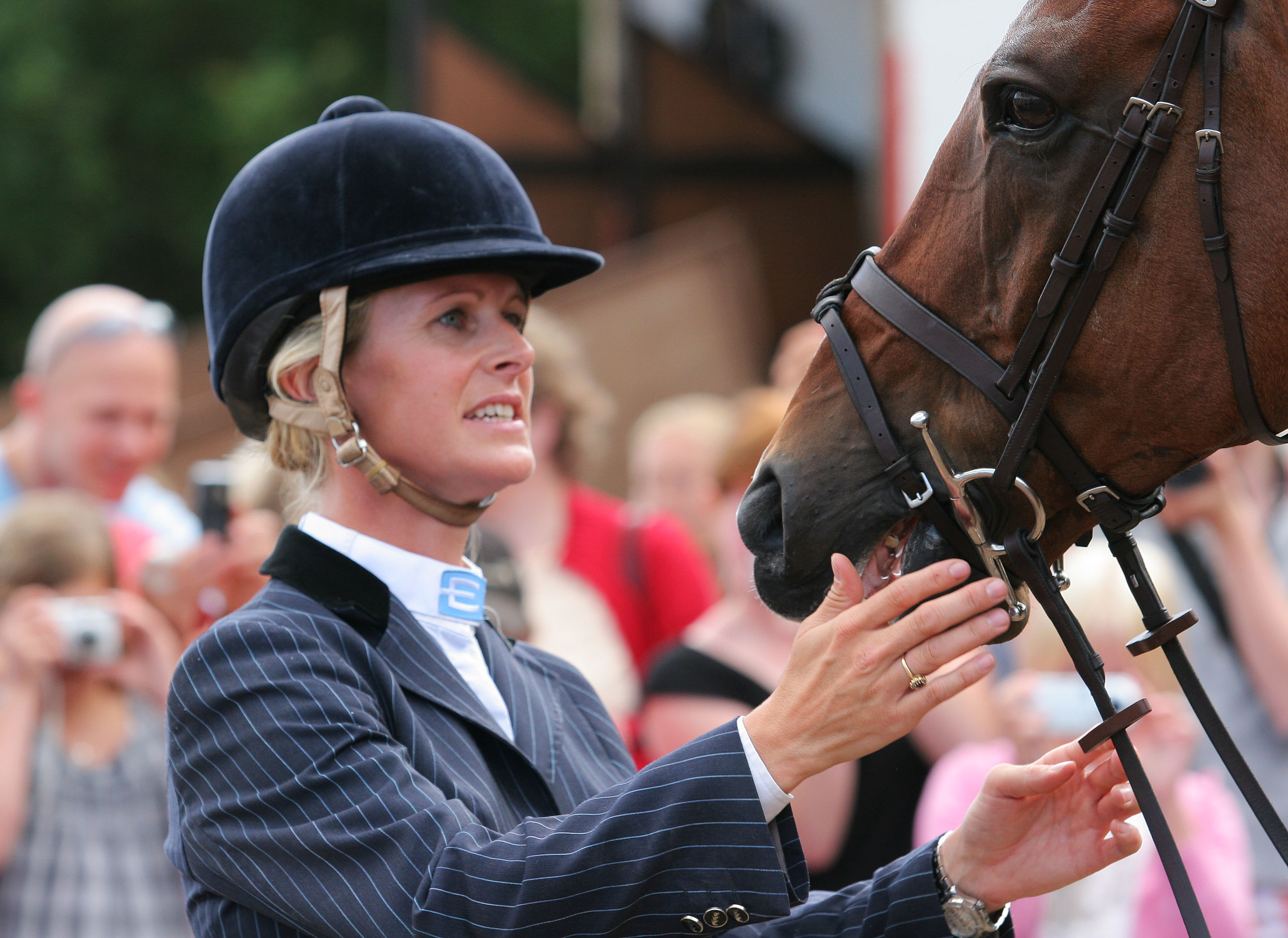
Piia Pantsu, Finnish rider, and her horse

In both France and the UK, the number of female riders is generally higher than the number of male riders, but men are over-represented at the highest levels of competition.

According to Tourre-Malen and French sociologist Fanny Le Mancq, the instrumentalization of the horse is fundamental to equestrian sport. This shift towards viewing the horse as a "performance tool" has altered the relationship between riders and horses, which tends to be less favorable to women due to the increased confrontational nature of the sport. In the early days of equestrianism, the emotional relationship played an important role, with the animal systematically referred to by name. The instrumentalization of the horse, seen as a "performance tool", accompanied progress in competitions. This is reflected, among other things, in a modification of the lexical field, leading to reification. This lexical field resembles that of motor sports at the highest level of competition, with expressions such as "programmed buttons", "lack of power", or "passes like a real 4x4". Care and emotional relationships are downplayed in favor of work and the quest for performance. This evolution in the relationship with the horse is consistent for both sexes; however, Le Mancq notes that women are increasingly disinterested in high-level competitions due to this shift, which contributes to their reduced presence at advanced levels.

Access to high-performance horses is becoming increasingly difficult at top level, as these riders generally don't own their mounts, but have them entrusted to them, and ride several of them. Building an affective relationship with the animal becomes difficult, as the rider-horse pair is likely to be separated at any moment. Fanny Le Mancq adds that the distinction between professional and amateur riders is to the detriment of the latter, who are devalued "because they ride for pleasure". Amateur women riders have to overcome a "double handicap" to gain recognition for their skills, as the world of equestrian competition is built by and for men, with a late and incomplete feminization. A number of women testify to the difficulty of asserting themselves in professional competitions, and the feeling that they don't fit in, as these competitions are attended by a majority of men for whom riding and the relationship with horses is a "business". For sports sociologist Vèrène Chevalier, a "glass ceiling" effect, common with other sports, blocks women's access to the highest level of competition, as their opportunities of access are not equal, either materially or symbolically: she cites as an example the fact that horse dealers and owners of high-performance competition animals are "imbued with gendered stereotypes", which dissuade them from selling or entrusting an excellent horse to a woman.

Tourre Malen and Kirrilly Thompson, vice-president of the South Australian Horse Society, argue that the careers of top-level female riders are also constrained by family obligations, such as child care, which are still divided along traditional gender lines. These responsibilities are often incompatible with the demanding roles of training, merchandising, and horse trading required at high levels of competition.

==== Equestrian sports ====
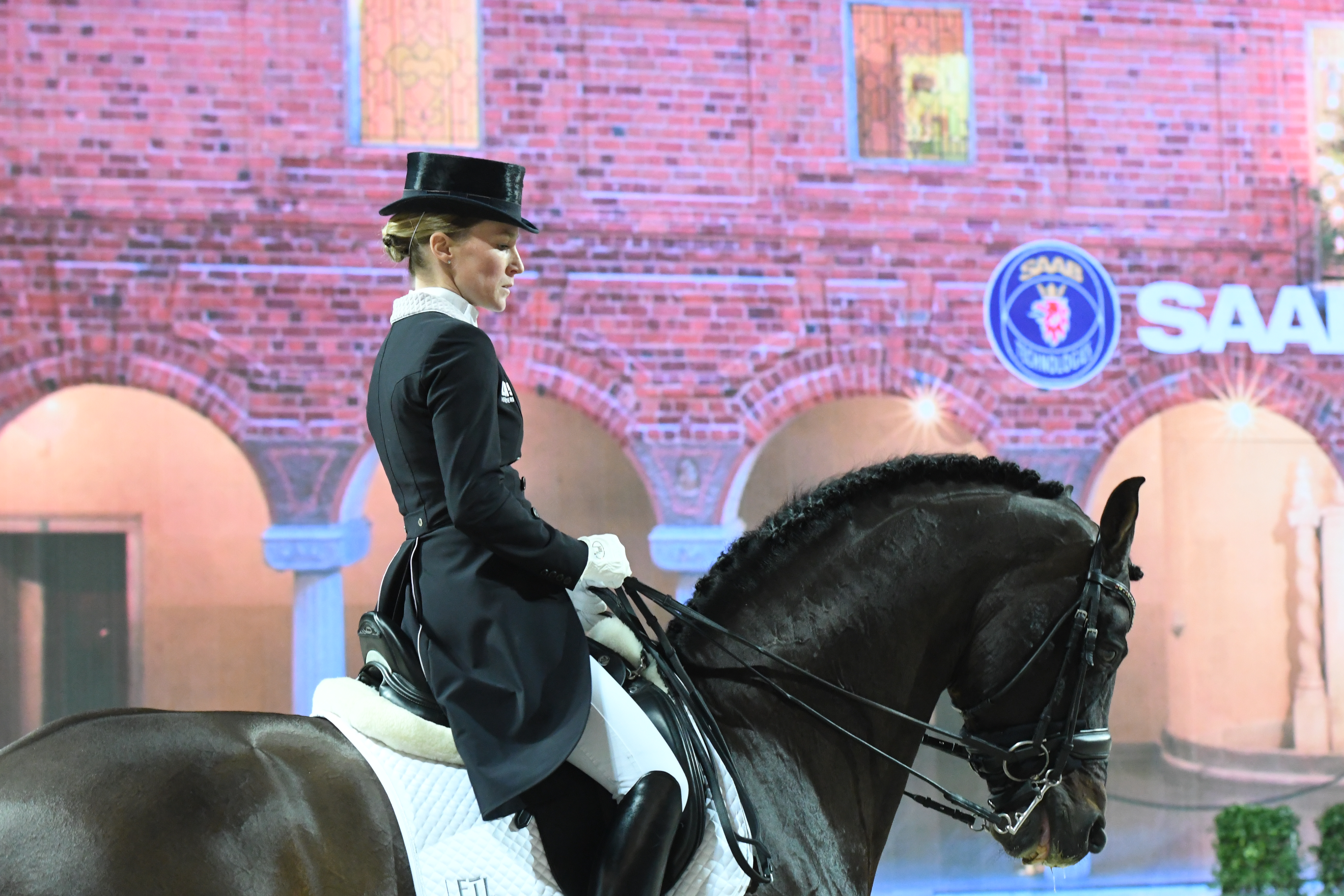
German dressage rider Helen Langehanenberg, 2018

Jumping competitions remain predominantly male-dominated at the highest levels, whereas dressage competitions are largely female-dominated, even at advanced levels. According to Catherine Tourre-Malen's survey, women generally prefer dressage, which is perceived as a more feminine sport. She analyzes the scarcity of women in show jumping as a phenomenon stemming from the market logic specific to this competitive milieu, which "distances it from the strict sporting dimension and reinforces its masculine image", adding that the show jumping milieu remains dominated by the figure of the "horseman", and that active sexual discrimination prevailed until the 1990s.

According to Tourre-Malen, spectators have a social expectation of grace and femininity during show jumping competitions, with women considered too ungraceful in the saddle being "carted off". French show jumper Pénélope Leprévost believes that "even at the highest level, women maintain a more tender relationship with their horses".

In China, there is a growing interest among women in acrobatic disciplines that combine equitation and gymnastics, such as acrobatics in circles.

==== From equestrian sports ====
The feminization of equestrian sport came later than the feminization of equestrian sport, becoming noticeable at the end of the 20th century in Sweden and the United Kingdom. In Japan, female jockeys are a rarity, with only six women having obtained their jockey's license since 1996. The first Group I gallop race won by a woman in France was in October 2020; Coralie Pacaut, the 2019 Cravache d'Or Feminine, believes that racing in France "remains macho" despite an increasingly visible female presence.

== Medical analysis ==
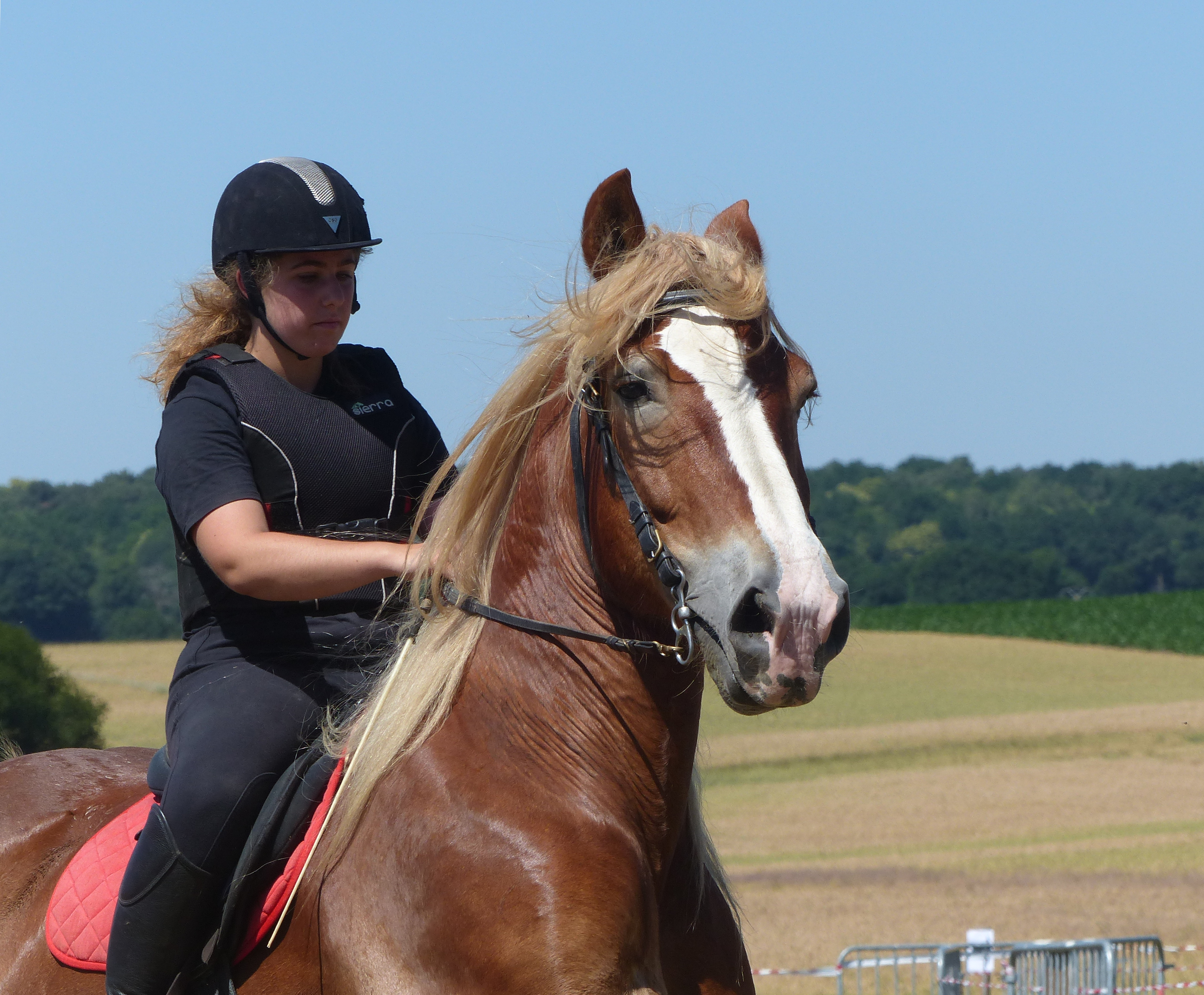
Breton rider at La Chapelle-Gaceline, 2017

At the beginning of the 20th century, women's horseback riding and cycling were likened by some doctors to a form of masturbation; more rarely, doctors of the time mentioned the possibility of diverting women from masturbation through horseback riding or cycling. These practices were suspected of harming female sexuality.

Since then, other more serious medical studies have examined the consequences of regular horseback riding on women's health. No statistical association has been found between regular riding and sexual dysfunction in either men or women.

According to a 2017 review of the scientific literature, over the long term, horse riding may predispose women to urinary stress incontinence, probably due to the impact on pelvic floor muscles during gait transitions.

In 1980, a study investigated panniculitis in four female riders, attributable to both cold exposure and their equestrian activities: these lesions were caused, in part, by wearing tight-fitting, poorly insulated cycling pants, slowing blood flow through the skin and thus reducing tissue temperature.

In 2015, three South Korean researchers studied the effects of horseback riding on female obesity, comparing two groups of obese women, one of whom rode a horse three times a week for 8 weeks, and the other who walked for the same length of time. They concluded that horseback riding led to a greater reduction in body mass index than walking.

== Symbolism and psychoanalysis ==
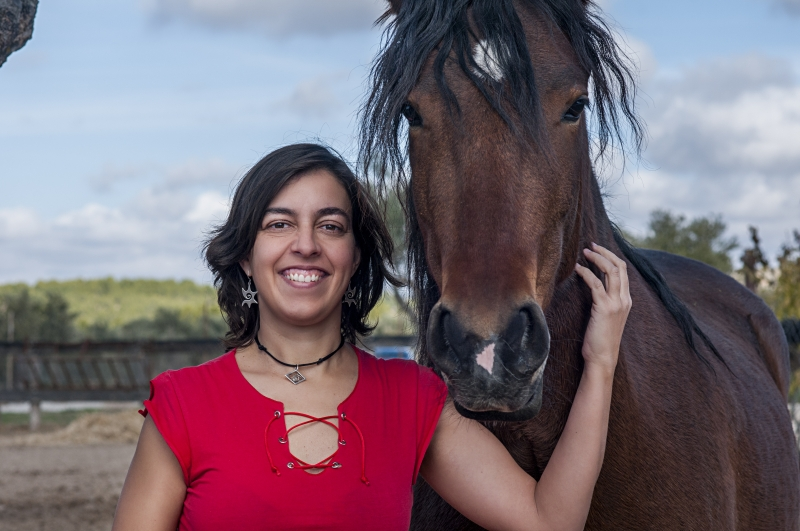
Young woman with a bay horse

Christian symbolism around the unicorn, a mythical creature often likened to an equine, involves the tradition of the virgin girl, who is depicted as both a "charmer and protector of the indomitable beast." This figure's purity and virginity are often compared to those of the Virgin Mary, the mother of Jesus.

According to Jean-Pierre Digard, the horse typically symbolizes power and masculinity. However, early psychoanalysts did not agree on the symbolic dimension of the horse. Sigmund Freud attributes the taming of the stallion to a resolution of the primary castration complex, associating the horse with the reappropriated phallus, enabling the little girl to be more feminine, gentle and loving, filling her phallus gap. He interprets the case of little Hans by assimilating the horse to the castrating father or grandfather.

In contrast, Carl Gustav Jung sees the horse as one of the archetypes of the mother, because it carries its rider just as the mother carries her child, "offers a gentle, rhythmic contact, and values its rider". In The Uses of Enchantment, Bruno Bettelheim explains many little girls' attraction to toy horses, which they style or dress, and later the continuity of this attraction through riding and caring for horses, by the need to compensate for emotional desires: "by controlling an animal as large and powerful as the horse, the young girl has the feeling of controlling the animality or masculine part in her".

In The Naked Ape, British zoologist Desmond Morris discussed the attraction of horse riding to girls and women, noting that horses are three times more popular among girls than boys. He attributed this preference to the horse's symbolic association with male attributes such as power and dominance. Morris suggested that the physical movements of riding—where the rider's legs are spread and in close contact with the horse's body—might be interpreted as having an erotic dimension.

In the early 20th century, riding was often associated with masculinity, which partly explains why Western women were historically prohibited from riding astride as men did. Some poets, such as F. G. Lorca, use the word "pouliche" to designate a spirited young woman. The feminization of equestrianism has gone hand in hand with a change in the symbolic perception of the horse.

== Cultural representations ==
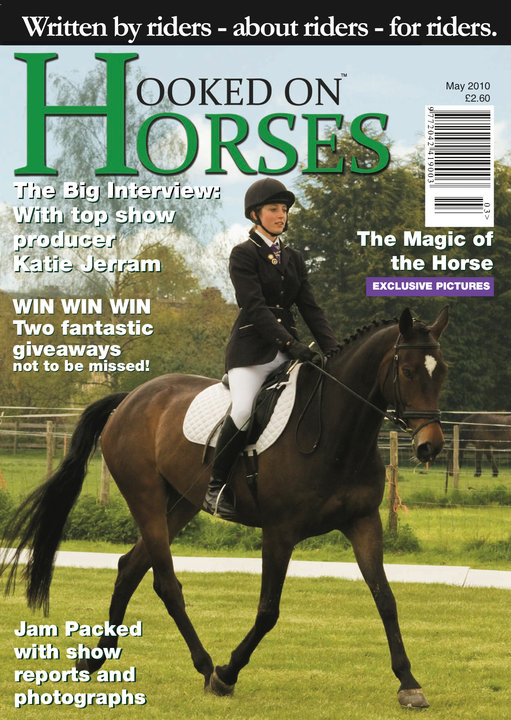
Cover of British equestrian press title

Since the mid-19th century, when the earliest works of children's and young adult literature were published, the emotional bond between children or teenagers and ponies or horses has been a prominent theme. This representation is often driven by urban authors who, despite their love for horses, lack the opportunity to interact with them regularly. This genre of literature nurtures the imagination and dreams of childhood, while also introducing young readers, particularly girls, to the world of equestrianism and the presence of female figures within it.

=== Literature ===
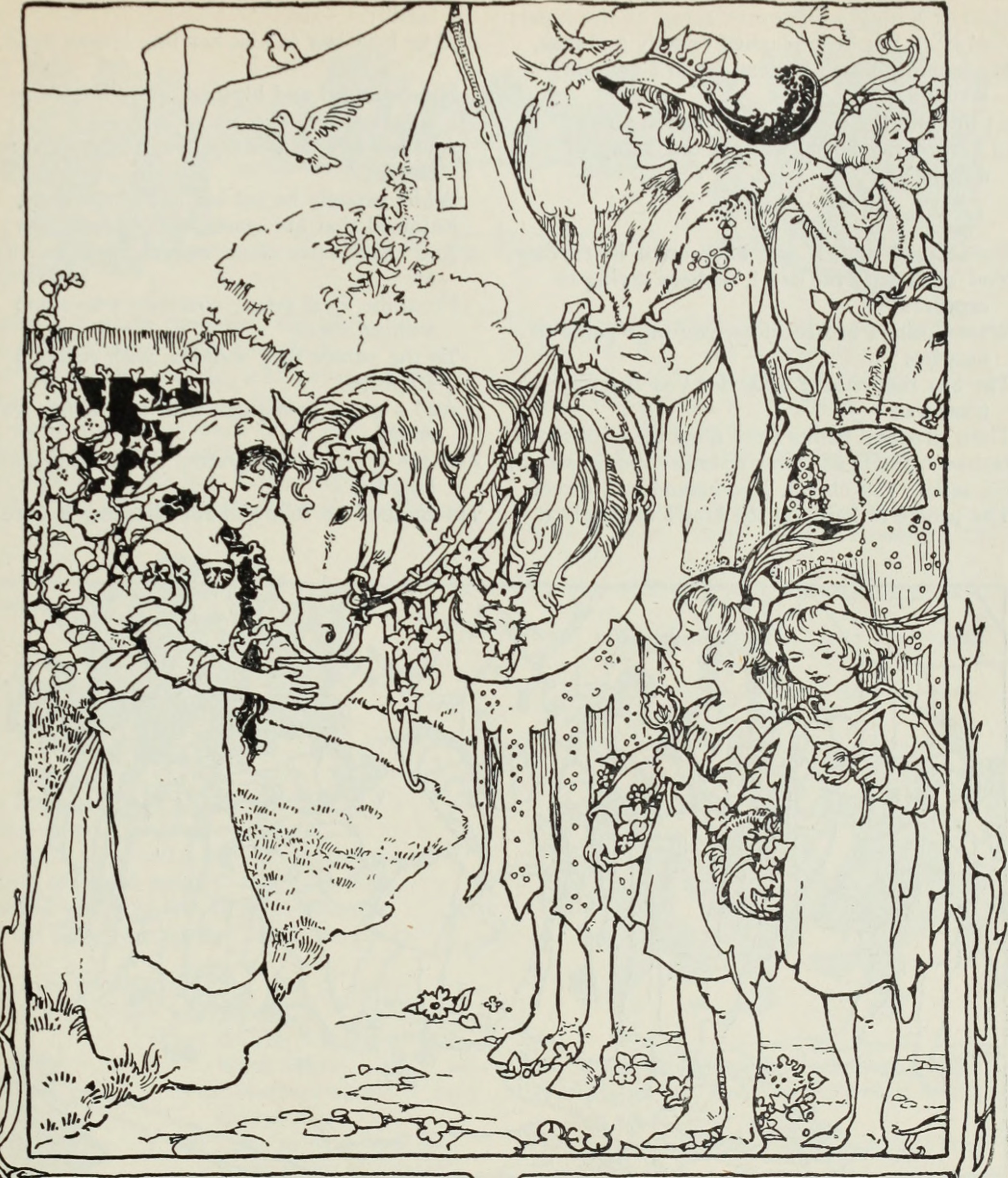
Illustration in The Bookshelf for boys and girls Children's Book of Fact and Fancy, 1912

The horse is a pervasive figure in children's and young adult literature in Western countries. From the 1980s onwards, the traditionally male model of the rider began to decline, and since the 2000s, there has been a notable increase in equestrian literary works aimed specifically at girls. Older works, such as The Black Stallion and My Friend Flicka, originally featured male protagonists until around the 1990s. However, more recent literature and adaptations of classic equestrian stories often feature female main characters instead. Literary works for adults do exist, but they are very much in the minority.

The first English-language novels with a female main character date from the 1910s and 1920s in the United States; like The Ranch Girls, they feature heroic female adventurers battling bandits. A real-life Blackfeet woman rider inspired J. W. Schultz's novel Running Eagle, The Warrior Girl (1919). These works are often written by English-speaking women who use pen names and place a certain emphasis on the emotional relationships between the characters. Ellen Singleton notes an evolution in the portrayal of female characters, reflecting changing gender stereotypes. For instance, Franck G. Patchin's novels often depict a weak girl paired with a strong, powerful horse, from which she derives her desired outcomes.

Anglo-Saxon pony books are designed as collectors' books for young girls.

In fiction for teenage girls, the main characters are always portrayed as white, often from upper-middle-class backgrounds, which ensures that they have sufficient financial income to ride horses. A notable feature of equestrian novels for girls published in the USA or Canada is that they are set in the "Wild West". Participation in equestrian competitions provides the majority of the action scenes.

From the 1990s onwards, equestrian novels like the Grand Galop series—a 95-volume series (as of 2010) featuring three 12-year-old girls—were translated into French, filling a gap left by the relatively few French-speaking authors in this genre. Grand Galop became the favorite series of young French women readers in the late 2000s, selling over 600,000 copies in 18 years.

These novels generally feature empathetic, nurturing girls and women, with a focus on emotional scenes and the discovery of sexuality, revealing themselves to be closer to the real personalities of a majority of female readers of their time than the adventurous characters of the early twentieth century. Male dominance is, according to Ellen Singleton, more marked: female riders regularly turn to male advice, so much so that she concludes that "in contemporary children's equestrian literature, it seems impossible to construct an active femininity without recourse to male representatives who act as critics, or experts [...]".

=== Press ===
At the end of the 2000s, among the approximately fifteen equestrian magazines published in France, those intended for children aged 3 to 13, such as Poney Fan, Cheval Girl, Cheval Star, and Cheval Junior, were specifically aimed at girls. These magazines featured comic strips with female characters, games, shopping ideas, and presentations of equestrian professions; animal magazines for children in the same age bracket, on the other hand, were mixed overall. According to education science professor Christine Fontanini, this cultural representation is probably behind the feminization of the veterinary profession, which became predominantly female in France from 1990 onwards.

Editions Atlas reaches over 500,000 French speakers with its horse fact sheets, explicitly targeting girls aged 8 to 18.

=== Television series ===
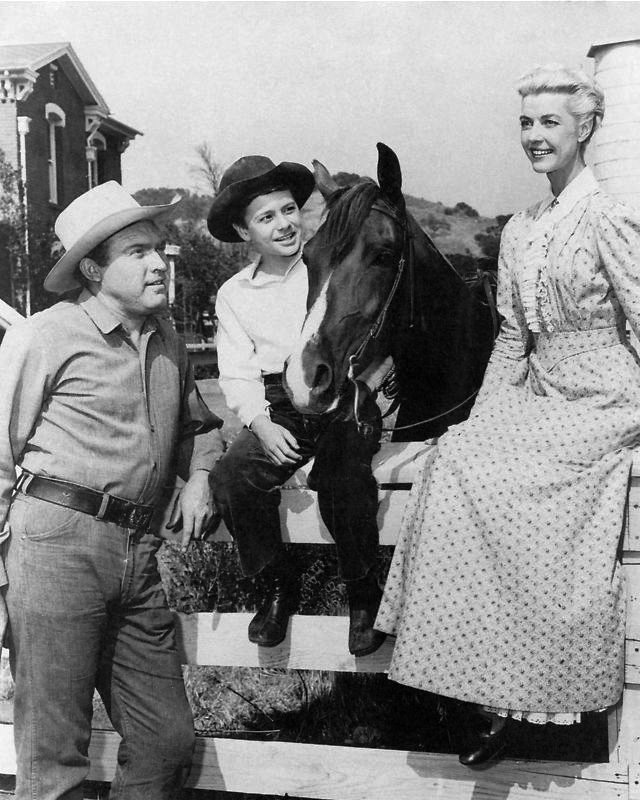
Promotional photograph for the American series My friend Flicka (1957)

Since the 2000s, several TV series have featured teenage girls in equestrian centers. In France, this is known as the "Poly syndrome", named after a famous French TV series from the 1960s. Adapted from the book series, Grand Galop (The Saddle club in its original version), which ran from 2001 to 2009, features Steph, Carole and Lisa at their riding school "Le Pin Creux". It was followed by Horseland: Welcome to the Ranch and its spin-off series The Ranch.

Another prominent series is Heartland, adapted from a literary series, which has been broadcast in 119 countries since 2007. The show follows Amy Fleming, a teenager in the initial seasons, who grows up on a family ranch in Alberta and makes a career out of her ability to feel horses' emotions. In 2016, its plot spans a decade, making Heartland the longest-running TV series in Canadian history.

=== Cinema ===
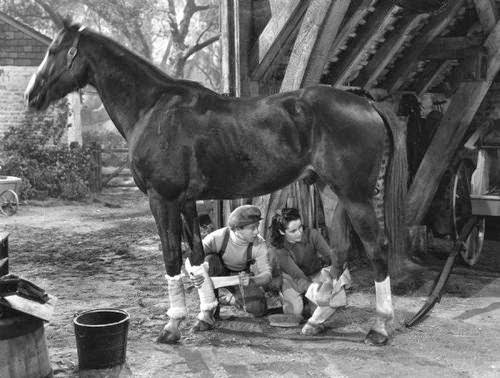
Promotional photograph from the film National Velvet

A seminal film for the representation of women riders in the Western world is the adaptation of Enid Bagnold 's best-selling 1935 novel, National Velvet (1944), starring Mickey Rooney (Mi Taylor) and Elizabeth Taylor (Velvet Brown), a 12-year-old girl who trains her horse, The Pie, to compete in and win the world's most prestigious horse race. National Velvet is the first blockbuster to feature a female athlete in a man's world. It was a source of inspiration for other films taking up the theme of a sporting woman fighting patriarchy. Released in 1944, it took place against a backdrop of women taking over the tasks usually assigned to their husbands who had been mobilized for the Second World War.

The 1986 film Sarraounia, directed by Med Hondo, features the African horsewoman and warrior queen of the same name, further diversifying representations of female riders in cinema.

The 1998 Disney animated film Mulan marked a significant moment by depicting a female warrior who disguises herself as a man and participates in all the action scenes, ultimately saving her country.

In 2012, the film Sport de filles was released, shedding light on the sociology of sport through the example of the feminization of equestrianism. The film features a gifted young rider trying to gain recognition for her talent from a riding master.

More recently, Disney's Frozen 2 reflects the feminization of the equestrian world in the West and breaks down gender stereotypes, featuring Elsa with whispering skills, and a mythological horse (a Nokk).

=== Toys ===
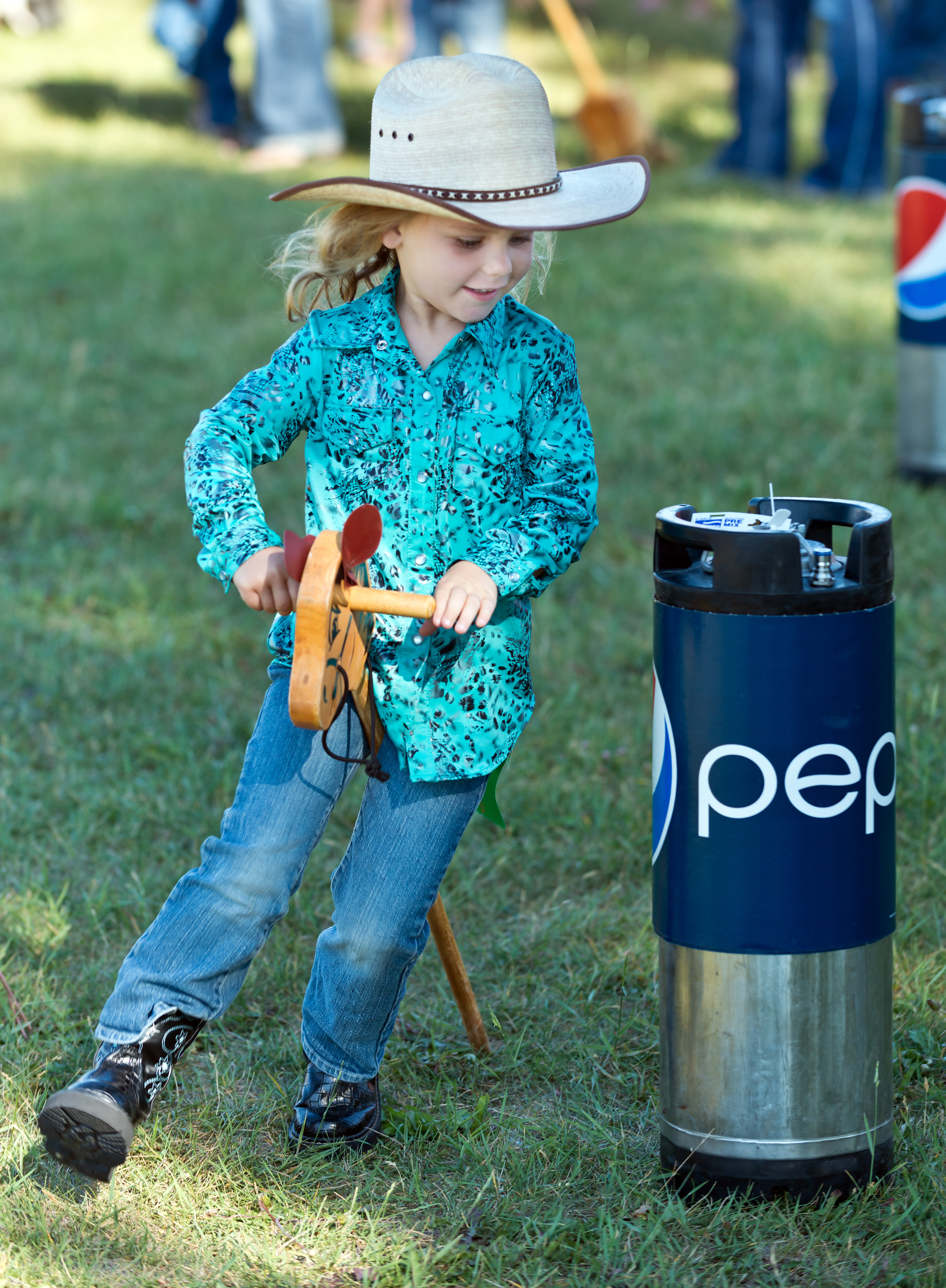
Little girl simulating a barrel race on a stick horse

There are many horse-shaped toys for girls, with Catherine Tourre-Malen citing the figurines in the My Little Pony range for the youngest, followed by the horses accompanying Barbie dolls. Horses were the first animals to accompany the development of the Barbie range.

== Taking a stand ==
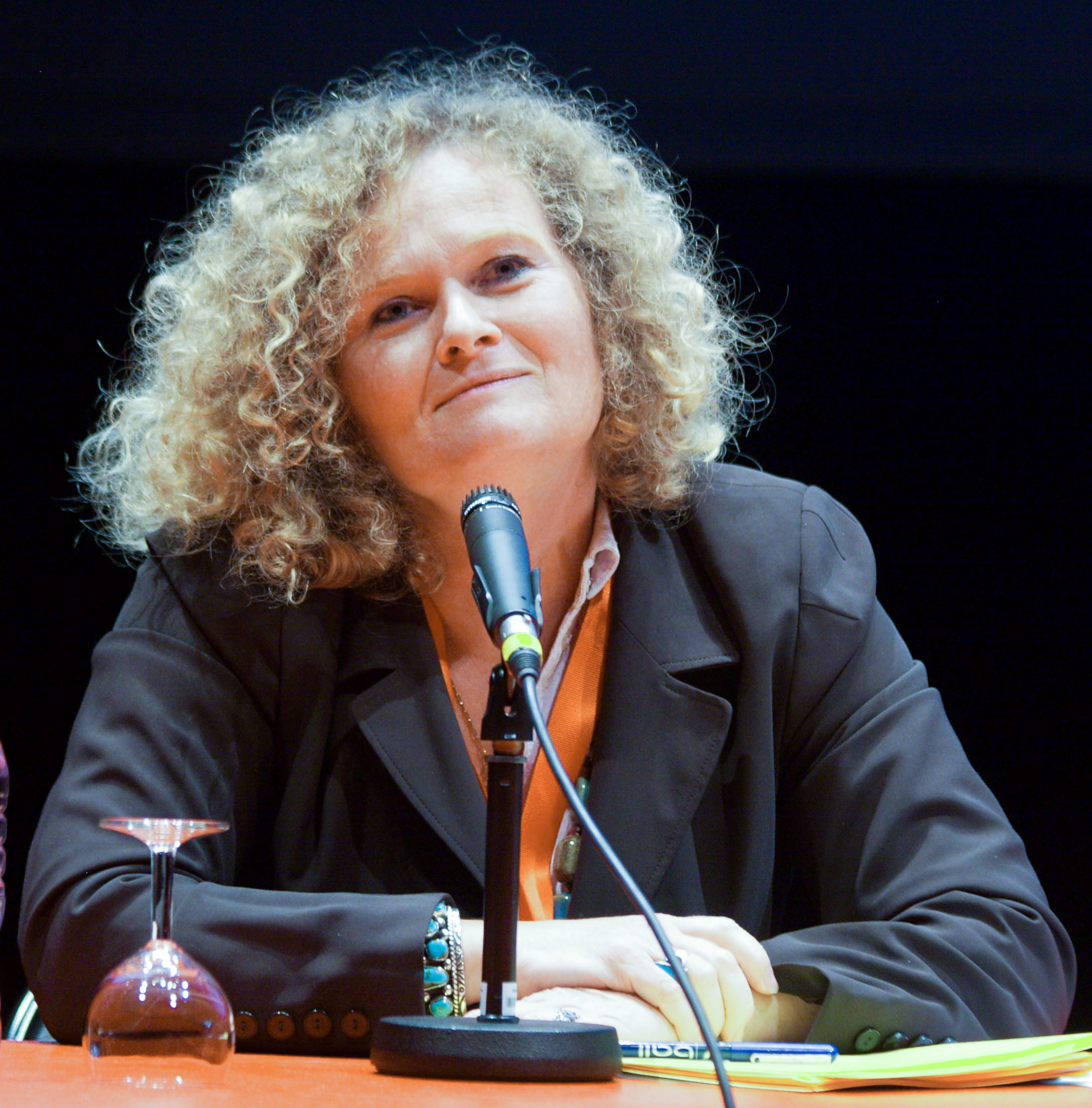
French geographer Sylvie Brunel, who believes that women have enabled the development of new equestrian activities

The feminization of horse riding in France provoked comment, debate, and position-taking. In 1995, ethnologist and anthropologist Jean-Pierre Digard felt that the feminization of equestrianism threatened the horse's future disappearance, due to the "animal sensibility" of women: "What would be left of horses if, having disappeared from streets and roads, battlefields and fields, they were also eliminated from race courses and riding arenas? The Falabella pony, a house horse with 50 centimeters at the withers? The companion horse, the Bardotian ideal of the dada-à-sa-mémère? It can never be too wary of love.

During a debate entitled "Le cheval, animal de droite ou de gauche?", organized by the Paris Horse Show in 2009, Digard declared that "horse-riding has become a sport for chicks", while anthropologist Catherine Tourre-Malen added that little girls are taught to "look after the pony and then the horse, tie little knots in their manes or prepare the saddle, on an emotional level, while boys, who are increasingly rare and no longer want to be mixed with girls, are taught to play games on horseback, referring to feats or chivalry", thus reinforcing gender stereotypes. Both declare that "what's important for the horse is not its well-being, but its outlets [...] including hippophagy, so eat horse! [...] Especially if you're a woman! This stance provoked strong condemnation, notably from women riders on forums.

Tourre-Malen concludes her thesis with the idea that the feminization of riding is not beneficial to the status of women, as women reproduce "patterns that assign [them] to the domestic sphere and child-rearing". Like Jean-Pierre Digard, she deplores women's desire to change the legal status of the horse to that of a pet.

Geographer Sylvie Brunel takes the opposite view, noting that women, notably through their awareness of the horse's sensitivity and their attachment to older horses, have spurred the development of equestrian practices that men's activities had not taken up or had left in decline, such as equitherapy, green tourism and ethological riding, which developed strongly from the mid-20th century onwards; she also notes that, far from disappearing under the impetus of women, the horse is spreading into geographical areas (urban and neo-rural) from which it had virtually disappeared.

According to Australian professor Kirrilly Thompson, the feminization of equestrian sports is met with opposition in Sweden and is not perceived as a symbol of gender equality.

== See also ==
- Equitation
- Equestrianism
- Endurance riding
- Zara Tindall - granddaughter of Elizabeth II who won silver at the 2012 Summer Olympics in team eventing, alongside 3 other women (Nicola Wilson, Mary King and Kristina Cook) and one man
