= George Claude Lockhart =

British ringmaster (1885–1979)

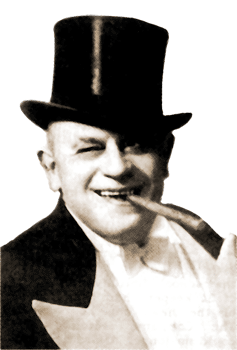
- George Lockhart (c.1960)
- Born: George Claude Locker; 1885
- Died: 1979 (aged 93–94)
- Occupation: Ringmaster
- Employer(s): Belle Vue (Manchester) Ltd, Forte Holdings Ltd, Blackpool Tower Circus
- Known for: Famous ringmaster for Belle Vue International Circus and Blackpool Tower Circus.

George Claude Lockhart (1885–1979) was the first ringmaster to wear the "pink" hunter tails and top hat, and was referred to in his World's Fair obituary as "The Doyen of Ringmasters". He was best known for being the ringmaster of the Bell Vue International Circus at Belle Vue, Manchester, England, and Blackpool Tower Circus.

== Early career ==
George Claude Lockhart (real name Locker) was the son of George William Lockhart, the famous elephant trainer. According to various accounts he broadcast on radio and in his book "Grey Titan", George was brought up around elephants. However, he made his first independent performance at the age of four in a child-only cast of the pantomime Cinderella along with other music hall/circus children. He apparently played the role of the prince. When he was not at school, George spent a lot of his time with the elephants Boney, Molly and Waddy and toured all over Europe with them. His father sold his original troupe of elephants in 1901 and bought four more from the animal dealer Carl Hagenbeck. This group would be known as "Lockhart's Cruet" and would become notorious for causing the death of George William Lockhart. According to George Claude Lockhart, they regularly stampeded and it was in one of these stampedes at Walthamstow station on 24 January 1904 that they killed their owner. The elephants were sold by his widow and George Claude Lockhart went to pursue a career not involving animals. He worked for George Hengler in Glasgow with his water productions undertaking various roles until 1914.

== Ringmaster ==
On 14 July 1914 Lockhart began his career as a ringmaster at Blackpool Tower during their summer seasons. This was interrupted when he did military service in World War I. He returned to work at Blackpool and continued to work there until 1945. He worked for the Bertram Mills Circus at Olympia for the 1923–24 Christmas season. He began working as the Belle Vue Circus ringmaster in 1928 and worked there until he retired at the age of 90 in 1970.

== Elephants ==
These were told in various newspaper interviews and articles plus his Essays in Adventure radio broadcast and his book with Willan Bosworth, Grey Titan. The elephant Waddy apparently almost killed him when he and his father were transporting the act across Europe by train. He was present when his father was killed during the stampede at Walthamstow station and was interviewed at the inquest. He saw the surviving members of this group of elephants, Salt and Saucy, when they worked at Belle Vue in 1938. This reunion was remarked upon in the World's Fair newspaper. When he was seventy The Express newspaper reported that George Lockhart had his arm crushed by the elephant Burma whilst he was taking visitors around the circus stables. According to the report he continued presenting the circus throughout the second half before being admitted to hospital for his injuries.

== Trademarks and legacy ==
Lockhart adopted the "pink" huntsmen tails, black hat, white shirt and gloves upon the advice of Bertram Mills when he worked for them in 1928. This has become the standard uniform of the stereotypical circus ringmaster. He also used to smoke a cigar when introducing the various acts and this, also, became an instantly recognisable characteristic of his showbusiness persona.

Lockhart was also famous for the various accounts he gave on his time spent with his father's elephants. According to a new book on his father's elephants, The Legend of Salt and Sauce by Jamie Clubb, much of George Lockhart's accounts on the elephants are romanticised versions of what actually happened, which alter in each progressive version.

George Claude Lockhart has been immortalised by having a road named after him. Lockhart Close was built by Wimpy Homes in 1987 on the former site of his beloved Belle Vue Zoo in Manchester. The small residential close is adjacent to Hoskins Close, named after Johnnie Hoskins and are both located off Ellen Wilkinson Crescent.

== Material written by George Lockhart ==
- Essays in Adventure Radio broadcast, 1941
- Stampede undated script by George Claude Lockhart for a radio broadcast
- Grey Titan: The Book of Elephants by Willan G. Bosworth and George Lockhart, 1938.
- Some more Elephant Stories – I meet my wife in an elephant stampede", Blackpool Gazette and Herald
- "Caught – In Elephant Stampede", Weekend newspaper, 1959

== Books featuring George Lockhart ==
- The Victorian Arena: The Performers Volumes 1 and 2, John Turner, Lingdale's Press 1995 and 2000 respectively
- Le Histories de Cirque, James Pinder and Jacques Garnier, 1978
- "George Lockhart, The Doyen of Ringmasters", Don Stacey, World's Fair 23 October 1979.
- The Two of Us: My Life with John Thaw, Sheila Hancock, 2004
- The Legend of Salt and Sauce, Jamie Clubb, 2008 (pre-publication

== See also ==
- Circus
- Ringmaster (circus)
- George William Lockhart
- Sam Lockhart
