= Belle Vue Zoological Gardens =

Former establishment in Manchester, England

- Main entrance on Hyde Road, rebuilt in 1957
- Interactive map of Belle Vue Zoological Gardens
- 53°27′49″N 2°11′15″W
- Date opened: June 1836
- Date closed: Zoo: 11 September 1977; Amusement park: 26 October 1980; Gardens: February 1982; Exhibition halls: October 1987; Speedway: November 1987
- Location: Gorton, Manchester, England

Belle Vue Zoological Gardens was a large zoo, amusement park, exhibition hall complex, and speedway stadium in Belle Vue, Manchester, England, that opened in 1836. The brainchild of John Jennison, the gardens were initially intended to be an entertainment for the genteel middle classes, with formal gardens and dancing on open-air platforms during the summer, but they soon became one of the most popular attractions in Northern England. Before moving to Belle Vue, Jennison, a part-time gardener, had run a small aviary at his home, the beginnings of the zoo that over the years grew to become the third-largest in the United Kingdom.

Jennison set out a small amusements area in Belle Vue during the 1870s, which was expanded in the early 20th century to become what was advertised as the "showground of the world". Popular rides included the 60 mph (97 km/h) Bobs roller coaster and the Scenic Railway. Other entertainments included grand firework displays from 1852 and the annual Belle Vue Christmas Circus from 1922. Music and dancing were popular attractions in Belle Vue's various ballrooms. The Kings Hall, which opened in 1910, housed the Hallé Orchestra for several years and hosted concerts by artists such as Jimi Hendrix, The Who, Nat King Cole, The Rolling Stones, Leonard Cohen, Johnny Cash and Led Zeppelin.

Catering for visitors at Belle Vue was on an industrial scale, ranging from the late 19th century hot water rooms, which accommodated up to 3,000 diners each, providing crockery and hot water for those who brought their own picnics, to more upmarket themed restaurants. Belle Vue became a part of the caterer and hotelier Charles Forte's business empire towards the end of its life in the 1960s. Although he made some improvements to the zoo, Forte's interests lay in developing the gardens' dining and exhibition facilities. The Kings Hall was then the largest exhibition space outside London, but competition from the G-Mex exhibition and conference centre in central Manchester led directly to its closure in 1987.

At its peak Belle Vue occupied 165 acres (0.67 km^{2}) and attracted more than two million visitors a year, up to 250,000 of whom visited over the Easter weekend. The zoo closed in September 1977 after its owners decided they could no longer afford its losses of £100,000 a year. The amusement park remained open on summer weekends until 1980. The land was sold in 1982, and the site was finally cleared in 1987. All that remains of Belle Vue today is a greyhound racing stadium and a snooker hall built in the stadium's car park.

== Commercial history ==
Belle Vue Zoological Gardens was the brainchild of entrepreneur and part-time gardener John Jennison. He opened the grounds around his home in Adswood, Stockport to the public in 1826, from where he and his wife Maria sold fruit and vegetables. He called his establishment Strawberry Gardens, later Jennison's Gardens. Manchester's increasing urban population encouraged the development of a thriving leisure industry, and public parks were popular. In 1828 or '29 Jennison purchased an adjacent 0.5 acres (0.20 ha) of land on which he and his wife built an aviary, to which they charged admission; its first occupant was a captured thrush. Jennison turned his home into a public house, the Adam and Eve, which he and his wife ran together.

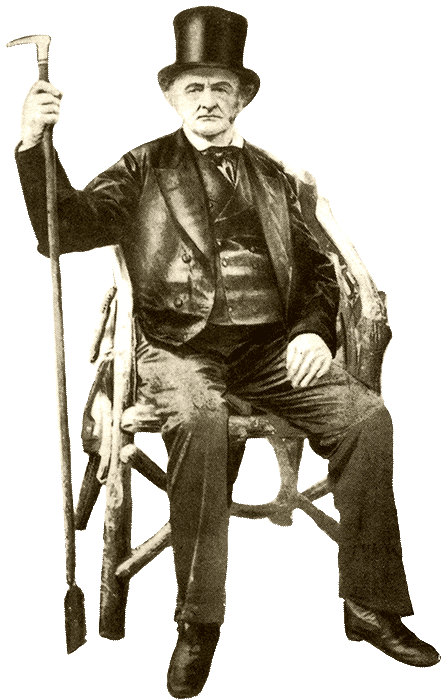
John Jennison, founder of Belle Vue Zoological Gardens

In 1835 Jennison was approached by businessman George Gill, who suggested that he lease Belle Vue – a public house in 35.75 acres (14.47 ha) of open land between Kirkmanshulme Lane and Hyde Road – as a more suitable site for his aviary. Jennison took out a mortgage of £300 to pay off the £80 mortgage on the Strawberry Gardens and spent the remainder on a trial six-month lease of the Belle Vue property, in June 1836. In December Jennison signed a 99-year lease at a rent of £135 per annum. For an extra £100 a year he leased additional land to extend the western boundary to Redgate Lane, close to Stockport Road, where he made a second entrance. To finance further expansion Jennison re-mortgaged the site for £800.

Except for their belongings, which fitted on a handcart, all the Jennisons took with them to Belle Vue was two or three birdcages containing parrots and other assorted birds. At its opening in 1836, Belle Vue contained an Italian Garden, lakes, mazes and hothouses, as well as the aviary. The family decided that their zoological collection had to be expanded as a matter of priority, and by 1839 elephants, lions, and other exotic African animals had been added. Many other attractions were subsequently added, including a racecourse in 1847. The gardens were an immediate success, but the neighbouring St James's Church was offended that they were open on Sundays, and asked Jennison to close while services were being conducted; he "politely but firmly refused".

Admission to the gardens, which were open until 9 pm during the summer, was by subscription ticket priced at 10 shillings for a family and 5 shillings for an individual, beyond the means of most workers. Concerts of "genteel music" were staged, and there was dancing to various bands on a large open-air wooden platform. Initially, the only public transport to Belle Vue was by horse-drawn omnibus from what is now Piccadilly, in central Manchester, but the last departure time of 6:00 pm coincided with the end of most workers' shifts. The first railway station was opened near Belle Vue in 1842, allowing workers easier access to the gardens and their attractions, and by 1848 complaints began to appear in the press that "roughs" in coarse attire were embarrassing middle-class ladies on the dancing platform by attempting to dance with them. There were also complaints about working-class men dancing together, and increasing resentment from working-class patrons about Belle Vue's "forbidding dress requirements, its restricted opening hours, [and] its unwelcoming admission price". In the words of historian David Mayer, Jennison was facing a crisis: "either keep Belle Vue Gardens an exclusive, class-specific, genteel preserve for the gentry and the middle class – who would arrive and depart in their own carriages through the Hyde Road gate – or open the gardens to a popular crowd who would arrive by train at the Stockport Road (Longsight) gate". For a time, Jennison sent carriages to the railway station to collect the first-class passengers, but he also abandoned the idea of subscription tickets, settling instead on a general admission price of 4d, rising to 6d in 1851.

=== Financial difficulties ===
Although the gardens thrived in their early years, by 1842 Jennison was in financial difficulties, and on 13 December bankruptcy proceedings were initiated. Jennison's problems were caused by his failure to sell the Strawberry Gardens property, competition from the recently opened Manchester Zoological Gardens, and the Manchester and Birmingham Railway track cutting through the land Jennison had leased in December 1836, restricting access to the gardens. Jennison twice tried unsuccessfully to sell Belle Vue, after which his creditors allowed him time to make a success of the gardens; by the end of the 1843 season Jennison was able to repay his debts. The railway that had been a thorn in his side eventually proved to be an asset when Longsight railway station was re-sited closer to Belle Vue in 1842, making it easier for visitors to reach the gardens.

=== Expansion ===
An additional 13 acres (5.3 ha) of farmland at the western end of the site was incorporated into the gardens in 1843. One of the ponds was enlarged to form a boating lake, which later became the Firework Lake. An island was created in the middle of the lake, which housed a natural history museum. In 1858 another 8 acres (3.2 ha) were leased, in the triangle between Kirkmanshulme Lane and Hyde Road, from which clay was extracted to make bricks for the gardens' buildings. The result of the excavations was a large hole that Jennison filled with water, creating the Great Lake in 1858. Two paddle steamers, the Little Eastern and the Little Britain, each capable of accommodating 100 passengers, offered trips around the lake for 1d (equivalent to £0.45 in 2025). By 1905 Belle Vue consisted of 68 acres (28 ha) of walled gardens, with an additional 97 acres (39 ha) outside its walls.

=== War years ===
During the First World War the gardens were used by the Manchester Regiment for drilling, and a munitions factory complete with railway sidings was built.

At the start of the Second World War the gardens were closed at noon following Neville Chamberlain's radio broadcast announcing that Britain was at war with Germany on Sunday, 3 September 1939, forcing the cancellation of an "open rehearsal" by the Gorton Philharmonic Orchestra. The nation's armed forces immediately sequestered the Exhibition Hall, the restaurants and most of the top floor of the administrative offices. They also took over the sports ground to use as a barrage balloon base, and dug several air-raid shelters. The gardens were allowed to re-open on 15 September 1939, and remained open throughout the rest of war, although parts of the site were requisitioned by Manchester Corporation and converted into allotments.

Although the Second World War forced the cancellation of many events, and made it difficult to feed all the zoo's animals, it was nevertheless very lucrative for the gardens. Profits steadily increased, and the company made several compensation claims for the requisitioning of its facilities. It was granted £4,000 in 1941 (equivalent to £175,000 in 2025) and £7,242 in 1942 (equivalent to £295,000 in 2025); in gratitude for the latter, the company presented the Civil Defence Service with a new mobile canteen.

=== Changes in ownership ===
The Jennisons had been considering setting up a limited company to administer the gardens since 1895. Most were in agreement except for Richard, John Jennison Snr's youngest son. After his death in 1919, the remaining family members created John Jennison & Co Ltd with a capital of £253,000 (equivalent to £11,300,000 in 2025), comprising investments and loans totalling £63,000 (equivalent to £2,800,000 in 2025). George Jennison became chairman, secretary, treasurer and joint managing director with John Jennison Jnr, John Jennison Snr's great-grandson. John, William, Angelo and Richard Jennison Jnr were appointed to the board of directors which was reported to be a "very happy board with few meetings and an entire absence of quarrels".

On 27 November 1924 the Jennisons agreed to sell Belle Vue for £250,000 (equivalent to £13,100,000 in 2025) to Harry George Skipp, but he was acting as an intermediary, and on 6 March 1925 a further contract was signed by the Jennisons, Skipp and a new company called Belle Vue (Manchester) Ltd. The agreement was for the new company to take over from 1 January 1925, but the transfer did not take place until 28 March. Under the new managing director, John Henry Iles, the gardens expanded to include what became a world-famous amusement park.

=== Later years ===
Belle Vue enjoyed a brief post-war boom between the end of the Second World War and the early 1950s. During the early 1960s, it could still attract 150,000 visitors on Easter Monday, but by the end of the decade that figure had dropped to about 30,000, as the competition from rival amusement parks increased. Sir Leslie Joseph and Charles Forte bought Belle Vue in 1956, but by 1963 Forte was in sole control. Although he made some improvements to the zoo, Forte's interests lay in developing the gardens' dining and exhibition facilities. Fire became an "ever present hazard" during Belle Vue's later years. The most devastating occurred in 1958 and destroyed many buildings, including the Coronation Ballroom. Although the zoo was spared, the fire almost reached the lion house, distressing one of the older lionesses so much that she had to be shot. Vandalism and theft also became serious and recurring problems; intruders killed 38 of the zoo's birds, including 9 penguins, in 1960.

== Zoo ==
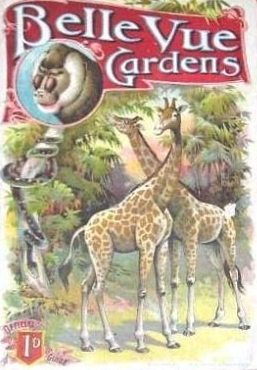
Cover of the official guidebook for the 1906 season

Belle Vue was the first privately financed zoo in England, and grew to become the third-largest in the UK. Jennison's original idea was that the gardens should be primarily a botanical excursion, but it became clear that the public was interested in the animals as an attraction in their own right. The initial collection had consisted of domestic birds and a few exotic parrots, but Jennison probably also acquired those animals that could not be sold after the Manchester Zoological Gardens closed in 1842. By 1856, the Jennisons had added kangaroos, rhinos, lions, bears and gazelles.

In 1871 the zoo acquired four giraffes; the following year an elephant, Maharajah, was bought for £680 from Wombwell's Menagerie No.1 in Edinburgh. The plan to transport Maharajah from Edinburgh to Manchester by train was abandoned after the elephant destroyed the railway compartment in which he was to travel. It was therefore decided that Maharajah and his trainer, Lorenzo Lawrence, should walk to Manchester, a journey they completed in 10 days with little incident. (Note: There was a story of an incident on the walk where it seems there was an argument at a tollgate. The crux of the argument was the question of what was the appropriate charge for the elephant when there was no entry for elephants on the toll rates chart. Maharajah's answer to the problem was to lift the gate off its hinges. Although the incident is probably apocryphal, it was the subject of a painting called "The Disputed Toll" by Heywood Hardy, and a book entitled The Elephant Who Walked to Manchester.) Lorenzo became the zoo's head elephant keeper, and stayed at Belle Vue for more than 40 years. Maharajah provided elephant rides to the public for ten years, until his death from pneumonia in 1882. His skeleton was preserved and added to the gardens' natural history museum. When the museum was decommissioned in 1941, the skeleton, along with other exhibits, was transferred to the Manchester Museum.

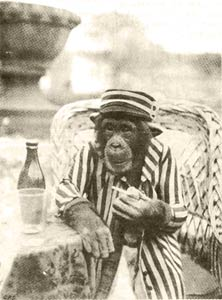
Consul, from his 1894 obituary

In 1893 a chimpanzee was purchased from another of Wombwell's Travelling Menageries in London. The four-year-old chimpanzee, Consul, was dressed in a smoking jacket and cap and puffed on a cob pipe; he frequently accompanied James Jennison to business meetings. Consul proved to be exceptionally popular, and after his death on 24 November 1894, (Note: An obituary was printed for Consul, to which Ben Brierley contributed this poem: "Hadst thou a soul?" I've pondered o'er thy fate Full many a time ... Thou hadst ways In many things like ours. Then who says Thou'rt not immortal? ... 'Tis God alone who knows where the "Missing Link" Is hidden from our sight; but, on the brink Of that Eternal line where we must part For ever, sundering heart from heart The truth shall be revealed ...) the Jennisons immediately obtained a replacement, Consul II, who played a violin while riding a tricycle around the gardens, later graduating to a bicycle.

Food for the animals became difficult to obtain during the First World War, but for the most part the gardens carried on as usual. Following the declaration of peace, several monkeys originally destined for government experiments with poison gas were acquired, as was a hippo, a dromedary and a zebra. In 1921 and 1922 the zoo obtained two animals who became great favourites. Lil, an Indian elephant, arrived in 1921 accompanied by her British Malayan handler, Phil Fernandez. Phil and Lil provided entertainment, advertising, and elephant rides for 35 years. Frank, a brown bear, arrived in 1922. By the time of his death, 40 years later, he was known as the "Father of the Zoo".

Open-air cages installed in the Monkey House resulted in a dramatic improvement in the life expectancy of its residents, but the potential for expansion and improvement after the First World War was limited by the post-war economy. Rising labour costs and minimal profits resulted in the gardens' increasing dilapidation. The zoo began to be neglected after the sale of Belle Vue in 1925, but it was rejuvenated by the appointment of Gerald Iles as zoo superintendent in 1933. A new Gibbon Cage and Monkey Mountain were created and the Reptile House was extended. In 1925, a display at the zoo was entitled "Cannibals" and featured black Africans depicted wearing alleged "native" dress.

On the outbreak of the Second World War in 1939, the animal keepers were issued with rifles to deal with any dangerous animals who might escape if the gardens were bombed. A night shift was introduced to watch over the animals 24 hours a day. A list of dangerous animals that was drawn up included 13 lions, 6 tigers, 2 leopards, 1 cheetah, 2 tigons, 3 other small cats and several bears. Although the zoo's administrators succeeded in convincing the local authorities that any danger from the animals was minimal, primarily because the perimeter walls were so high, the keepers were replaced in their sharp-shooting role by soldiers who patrolled the grounds armed with tommy guns.

Stocks were increased by animals transferred from other zoos that had been forced to close. Initially the zoo was given favourable food rationing quotas, but certain foods became unavailable and the price of others increased dramatically. Bananas were impossible to obtain and the supply of fish was problematic. As a result, the keepers were forced to experiment. The sealions became casualties of the food shortage when their keepers attempted to feed them strips of beef soaked in cod liver oil. Although they seemed to thrive on this diet, their digestive systems were unable to cope with the unusual food, and they eventually died of stomach ulcers. The lions' new diet was green-coloured horsemeat, and the monkeys were fed on boiled potatoes. The birds-of-paradise (lack of millet), and the penguins (lack of fish), were unable to adapt to their make-do diet and also succumbed. Vegetables were not in short supply however, as the garden staff grew lettuce, cabbage and carrots in the kitchen gardens.

Wartime interruptions in the supply of gas for heating resulted in the deaths of all the zoo's tropical fish and several other animals, including a lioness called Pearl and her litter of cubs. Although Manchester was heavily bombed during the Blitz, the gardens sustained only minor damage. The Scenic Railway was hit by an incendiary bomb and the Reptile House was damaged by shell splinters from ack-ack guns, which also caused the death of a bull bison.

Iles remained as superintendent until 1957, and proved to be a good publicist for the zoo, taking part in radio and television programmes such as Children's Hour. A new attraction was introduced in 1963, a chimps' tea party, which proved to be very popular. The zoo's last superintendent, Peter Grayson, took over in 1971, but by then the owners of Belle Vue had lost interest in the zoo, and closure seemed imminent.

News that Belle Vue Zoological Gardens would close on 11 September 1977 was announced on BBC Radio at 10:00 am on 4 August 1977. The 24 keepers were informed an hour before the news report went on air. The reason given was that the company could no longer afford to cover losses of about £100,000 per year. Shortly before the closure, a number of non-poisonous reptiles were stolen from the Reptile House, only one of which, a 10-foot (3.0 m) python, was recovered.

A 15-year-old elephant, Ellie May, had acquired an undeserved reputation for being dangerous, which made her extremely difficult to sell. Her food costs became difficult to justify, but Grayson refused to have her put down. Although he left the zoo in January 1978, Grayson returned frequently to care for Ellie May, the last animal left at the zoo. Eventually Rotterdam Zoo agreed to take her, and plans were made to transport the elephant to the Netherlands. Ellie May refused to budge however, and overnight developed pneumonia and heart failure. Grayson and veterinary surgeon, David Taylor, felt that she would not recover, and decided to call in a marksman to euthanise her.

Public reaction to the zoo's closure was one of "relative indifference", with only a few minor protests. The doors remained open to visitors at a discounted admission price until early November, a little beyond the official closing date, by which time most of the animals had been sold for an estimated £100,000.

== Gardens and amusement park ==
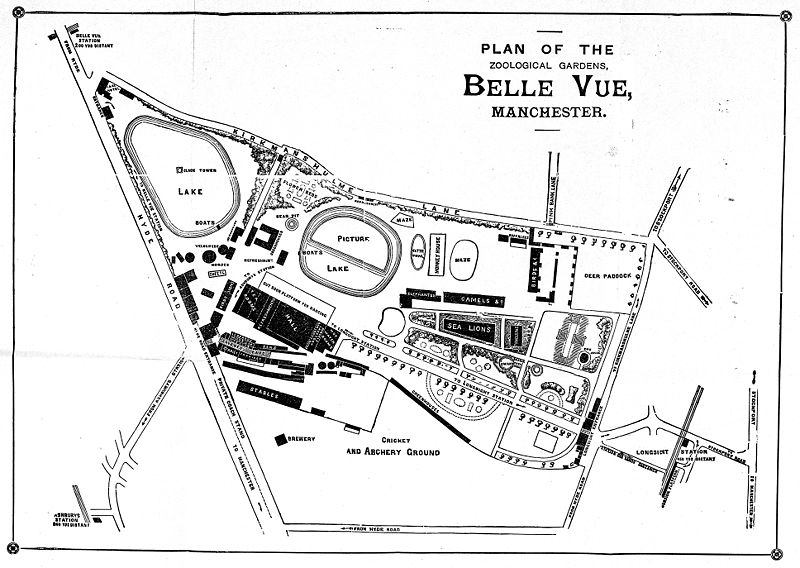
Plan of the gardens from the official guide published for the 1892 season

Under the Jennisons, the main priorities for Belle Vue were the zoological and botanical gardens; amusements were provided merely as a distraction. The Jennisons laid out formal gardens in various styles between 1836 and 1898, including mazes, grottoes, an Italian garden, "billiard-table lawns" and constructed Tropical Plant Houses. There were also exotic constructions like the Indian temple and grotto, designed by George Danson, Belle Vue's scenic artist. Built to resemble a ruined temple, it housed snakes and crocodiles as well as flowers. At the end of the 19th century, "the resort relied almost entirely for its attraction on its delightful gardens", but by 1931 the formalism had entirely disappeared. The gardens were also used to stage large political rallies for a wide spectrum of opinion, such as the Great Liberal Demonstration of 1924, at which Lloyd George addressed a crowd of 50,000, the first political meeting at which loudspeakers were used. The British Union of Fascists, popularly known as the Blackshirts, also held a meeting there, in September 1934. One contemporary commentator observed that "perhaps the Ku Klux Klan will be found in session there one day, for Belle Vue is nothing if not catholic". In contrast to this, the centenary celebrations of the Trades Union Congress in 1968 also took place at Belle Vue.

The Jennisons set out a small amusements area near the main entrance to the gardens in Hyde Road during the 1870s. comprising steam-driven attractions such as the Ocean Wave, installed in 1894, which simulated a storm at sea. (Note: "A circular platform, equipped like the bridge of a ship, [the Ocean Wave] is set among scenery painted to represent the waves of an ocean during a high wind. Round the edge of the platform is a line of small yachts. Powerful machinery makes the platform revolve, and at the same time rise and fall, giving the yachts a motion not unlike the ones they have at sea.")

John Henry Iles, who took over control of Belle Vue in 1925, believed that expansion of the rides and the fun aspect of the park was the way forward, and added attractions such as dodgems, the Caterpillar, the Ghost Train, Jack & Jill, and the Flying Sea Planes. The Scenic Railway, purchased in 1925 but not fully operational until two years later, proved to be one of Belle Vue's most popular rides, and remained in use until 1975.

The Bobs roller coaster was arguably the most popular ride of all, so named because it cost a shilling (colloquially known as a "bob") for admission. It had an 80-foot (24 m) drop at a 45 degree angle, down which the cars travelled at 60 miles per hour (97 km/h). It was built by Harry Traver and designed by Fredrick Church, who had to develop a series of engineering innovations to make the ride possible. The Bobs' distinctive white-painted wooden superstructure became an imposing element of the Belle Vue skyline.

During the 1960s and 1970s "Professor" Len Tomlinson operated one of the UK's last flea circuses in a small booth on the amusement park. The attraction consisted of harnessed human fleas racing chariots at the rate of an inch every few seconds, pulling a garden roller, riding a tricycle and "fencing fleas" scrabbling at pins stuck in pieces of cork in a semblance of a sword fight. The flea circus closed down in the late 1970s as improvements in domestic living conditions made human fleas more difficult to obtain.

When the zoo closed in 1977, it was announced that the gardens and amusement park would be expanded with "new active leisure pursuits". By 1978 the site had been renamed Belle Vue Leisure Park, and the Tropical River House had been converted to a skateboard arena in an attempt to cash in on the new craze from America. The arena turned out to be poor investment however, as there was virtually no demand after the first few months. The 1977 closure of the London Festival Gardens in Battersea, London, allowed Belle Vue the opportunity to buy their Jetstream ride, which opened the following year.

Other attractions that closed at about the same time as the zoo included the boating on Firework Lake, and the miniature railway. In 1979 the amusement park was leased to the main concessionaire, Alf Wadbrooke, although by then it was only open at weekends during the summer season. The long-promised restoration of the Scenic Railway had not happened and the Water Chute had closed. In August 1980, Wadbrooke was given notice to close down the park by 26 October 1980 and to have all his equipment removed by February 1981.

== Music and dancing ==
In 1853 Belle Vue staged the first British open brass band championships. Attended by a crowd of more than 16,000, it was the first of what became an annual event until 1981. A revival occurred in the popularity of brass band contests during the 1970s; competitions between local bands could attract crowds of up to 5,000.

Belle Vue contained several ballrooms, the first of which was constructed in 1851, above a hotel at the Longsight entrance to the gardens. A larger structure, the Music Hall, was built in 1856, underneath the firework viewing stand, capable of accommodating 10,000 people on its 27,000 square feet (2,500 m^{2}) of dance floor. A wooden open-air dancing platform was opened in 1852, and by 1855 had been extended to cover an area of 0.5 acres (0.20 ha). Throughout the summer, music was provided by bands such as the Belle Vue Military, the Belle Vue Quadrille and the Cheetham Hill Brass Band. Open-air dancing continued until the 1940s, but by then the attraction had lost its appeal, and the platform was converted to a roller skating rink. It was destroyed by fire in 1958. The same fire destroyed the Coronation Ballroom, which was replaced by a "huge ballroom complex" known as the New Elizabethan Ballroom in 1959. With room for 4,000 dancers on its two floors, it was described as being "unsurpassed in Great Britain for size, comfort and elegance". Many well-known bands of the time regularly played for the dancers, including Geraldo and his Orchestra and the Joe Loss Orchestra. During the 1960s and 1970s the ballroom also hosted discothèques, such as Jimmy Savile's Top Ten Club.

== Kings Hall ==
Opened in 1910 the Kings Hall was a converted teahouse or tea room, enlarged in 1928 and reconstructed as a "saucer like arena" capable of seating 7,000 people. The name "Kings" was chosen in reference to the two kings who reigned during the six-week period of its construction: George V and Edward VII. The hall was designed to stage "Demonstrations, Exhibitions, Social Gatherings, etc", and was a popular concert venue until the 1970s, with appearances by artists such Jimi Hendrix, The Who, Nat King Cole, The Rolling Stones, Leonard Cohen, Johnny Cash and Led Zeppelin. The Kings Hall became home to the Hallé Orchestra in 1942, when its previous base, the Free Trade Hall, was damaged by bombing during the Manchester Blitz; the orchestra continued to perform concerts at Belle Vue for more than 30 years.

From 1961 until 1966, bingo sessions were held in the hall. Able to accommodate up to 3,500 players, it was advertised as the "largest bingo club in the world". Many exhibitions were also held in the hall, which with its 100,000 square feet (9,300 m^{2}) of floor space was one of the largest venues outside London. It was split into three separate halls in 1956, to allow three exhibitions to be run simultaneously.

The last piece of live music played in the hall, on 14 February 1982, was a performance by the Glossop School Band, who were taking part in the North West Amateur Brass Band Championship in front of a crowd of 1,700. The hall had been sold 18 months earlier to a development company, Espley Tyas Development Group, and was by then scheduled for demolition to allow the site to be redeveloped. News of the sale had triggered the formation of local action groups, who organised a petition signed by 50,000 people in an unsuccessful effort to save the hall. The exhibition halls were sold to Mullet Ltd. in 1983, but competition from the newly opened G-Mex exhibition and conference centre in central Manchester led directly to their closure. The site was sold to the British Car Auction Group in 1987, and the buildings demolished to make way for a large car auction centre.

== Catering ==
The gates were opened to visitors between 10:00 am and 10:30 pm. Kiosks around the gardens sold snacks and ice cream, made in Belle Vue's own ice cream factory. Families were catered for at lunchtimes by the hot-water rooms, each of which could accommodate up to 3,000 diners, providing hot water for drinks and crockery for visitors who brought their own picnics. The price was 2d per person, according to the 1892 guide book, and cakes and jams made in the gardens' bakery and on-site kitchens were also available, at extra cost. "One shilling tea rooms", close to the hot water rooms, offered lunchtime deals such as a pot of tea, bread and butter, green salad and fruit cake for a shilling. The more expensive restaurants tended to open during the evening. Alcohol was available in the many licensed premises in the gardens, including, until its closure in 1928, beer produced in Belle Vue's on-site brewery. Many public houses were also opened in the area immediately surrounding the gardens.

Licensed hotels were built at each of the three entrances to the gardens. The Longsight Hotel, built in 1851 and demolished in 1985, was a part of the entrance. The Lake Hotel, built in 1876, had facilities for the free stabling of horses belonging to Belle Vue's visitors. It was extended in 1929 and then again in 1960, when a concert room was added, offering late-night entertainment. After its closure in the 1980s, the hotel was demolished. The Hyde Road Hotel and Restaurant at the main entrance, originally known as Belle Vue House, was renamed the Palm Court Restaurant in 1942, and then Caesar's Palace in 1969. It housed a cabaret bar and a restaurant, which was converted to an amusement arcade in 1976 when it was once again renamed, to Jennison's Ale House. The building was closed after a partial collapse in 1980.

== Firework displays ==
After a trip to London to visit The Great Exhibition of 1851, Jennison's ideas for Belle Vue became more ambitious. He decided to implement large, scheduled "fantastic" firework displays employing a scenic artist, George Danson, to design and create a 30,000-square-foot (2,800 m^{2}) canvas backdrop. The displays took place on an island in the middle of the Firework Lake, which also housed a small natural history museum. In keeping with Jennison's desire for self-sufficiency, the fireworks were made on-site at Belle Vue.

The first display took place on 2 May 1852, designed by "Signor Pietro". The theme for the early displays was "battle enactment", which proved to be popular with the paying public and resulted in Belle Vue becoming an all-day entertainment venue. The firework displays incorporated real people and real weapons, some of which, 1866-vintage Snyder rifles, were issued to members of the local Home Guard during the Second World War. The first display, a re-enactment of the Bombardment of Algiers involving 25 men, 300 rockets, 25 "large shells", and 50 Roman candles, was watched by 18,000 spectators.

The displays continued throughout the First World War, except that the use of rockets was prohibited under the Defence of the Realm Act. Reflecting contemporary events, the theme for the 1915 display was "The Battle of the Marne"; in 1916 it was "The War in Flanders", during which one spectator got so caught up in the action that he waded across the lake to join in with the "fighting". Anticipating the outbreak of the Second World War, the theme for the 1933 display was "Air Raid on London".

The last grand firework display took place in 1956, on the theme of Robin Hood and His Merrie Men.

== Circus ==
The first Belle Vue Circus took place in 1922, but it was not considered a success. The next was staged in 1929, after the company negotiated a deal with the Blackpool Tower Company to provide acts and equipment for what subsequently became a regular Christmas event held in the Kings Hall. One of the first arrivals from Blackpool was ringmaster George Lockhart, known as "the prince of ringmasters". Lockhart became synonymous with the Belle Vue Circus, and his face was used on many advertising posters. Zoo superintendent Gerald Iles included some of the zoo's animals in the circus, in a feature called Noah's Ark.

For the 1967–68 season, to celebrate his 39th consecutive year, the circus was temporarily renamed the "George Lockhart Celebration Circus". Lockhart was the ringmaster for 43 years, until his retirement in 1970 at the age of 90. His replacement, Danish-born Nelly Jane, held the job for two years before being replaced by Norman Barrett, the last ringmaster. Another of the circus stalwarts was resident band leader and Belle Vue's musical director Fred Bonelli, who started his career as a trumpet player for Barnum and Bailey's circus band, and led various Belle Vue circus bands for 40 years.

Many of the acts featured animals, such as Eugene Weidmann's mixed group of tigers and bears, Thorson Kohrmann and his Farmyard Friends, Willi Mullen's Caucasian Cavalry & Ponies, Miss Wendy's Performing Pigeons and Harry Belli's Horse Riding Tiger. As well as the animal acts there was the usual collection of acrobats, strongmen and clowns, two of whom, Jacko the Clown and his partner "Little Billy" Merchant, performed at Belle Vue for thirty years.

The last circus to take place in the Kings Hall before its sale was in 1981. For a few years afterwards the circus continued in the car park, then in a marquee on wasteland directly opposite the gardens' main gates on Hyde Road.

== Sports facilities ==
Sporting events became a permanent feature at Belle Vue after an athletics stadium was built in 1887.

=== Greyhound racing ===
Greyhound racing was introduced to Belle Vue in 1926, in the UK's first purpose-built greyhound stadium, constructed at a cost of £22,000. It was built on land leased by Belle Vue to the Greyhound Racing Association (GRA), a company chaired by Sir William Gentle, who was also the chairman of Belle Vue (Manchester) Ltd. The site was sold to the GRA in 1937, with the proviso that it had to be used for greyhound racing.

=== Speedway ===
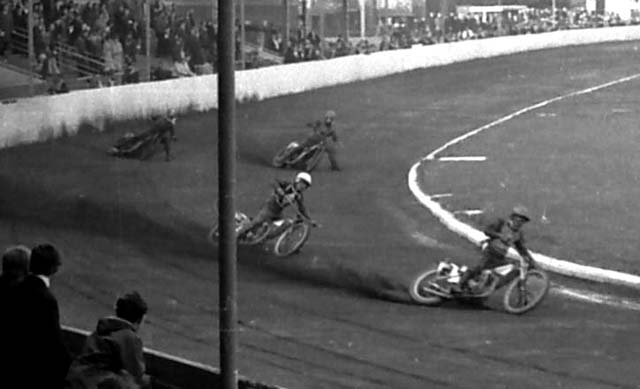
Speedway racing in 1963

One of the activities that became synonymous with Belle Vue was speedway (known at the time as dirt track racing), which was introduced on 28 July 1928 in the recently built greyhound racing arena. The sport proved to be very popular, and the decision was taken to convert the 1887 athletics ground into a speedway stadium, which opened on 23 March 1929. It was at the time the largest purpose-built speedway stadium in the country, possibly in the world. Eventually it became the first home of the Belle Vue Aces, but it was also used for many other events, such as football, cricket, rugby league (Belle Vue Rangers), baseball, stock car racing and tennis. The stadium had covered accommodation for 40,000 spectators. As the speedway bikes ran on wood alcohol (known as dope), they were unaffected by fuel rationing during the Second World War and racing was able to continue, although many other attractions in the gardens were forced to close.

Belle Vue sold the stadium in 1982, but speedway continued there until 1987; the final event was a stock car race, held on 14 November 1987, shortly before the stadium was demolished after having been sold to the British Car Auction Group. The Belle Vue Aces returned to their first home, the greyhound stadium, where they had begun in 1929.

=== Boxing and wrestling ===
From the late 1920s until the outbreak of the Second World War, Belle Vue was "the boxing Mecca of Europe". Bouts were held in the Kings Hall, and although popularity declined in the years following the war, Belle Vue staged a televised world championship fight in 1964 between Terry Downes and Willie Pastrano.

The first wrestling contest took place in the Kings Hall on 15 December 1930, and proved to be a popular attraction. Except for a break during the Second World War, events continued to be held until 1981, watched by up to 5,000 spectators. Popular performers included Jack Pye, Big Daddy, and Giant Haystacks.

=== Rugby league ===
The speedway stadium became the home of rugby league club, Broughton Rangers, who recruited international players including Frank Whitcombe (who also worked in the zoo as a zookeeper), Billy Stott, and James Cumberbatch. When the club was taken over by Belle Vue in 1933 Broughton were given a 21-year lease for use of the stadium, at a rent to be based on attendances. The first Anglo-Australian Test match of the 1933–34 Kangaroo tour of Great Britain was played at Belle Vue, with the home side's victory attracting approximately 34,000 spectators.

Games were suspended during the Second World War, and on their resumption in 1945 the club was renamed Belle Vue Rangers. Belle Vue declined to renew the lease when it expired in 1955 as the arrangement was proving to be a "financial burden", and the team was disbanded.

=== Football ===
After a fire at Manchester City's Hyde Road ground in 1920, the club considered a move to the Belle Vue athletics stadium, but it was deemed too small. At the behest of Belle Vue director John Henry Iles and John Ayrton, Manchester Central, was formed, and played its home matches at the speedway stadium. One of Manchester Central's first matches at Belle Vue was a visit by FA Cup holders Blackburn Rovers in September 1928. The club attempted unsuccessfully to join The Football League in 1930 and in 1931; with momentum lost, the club folded by the end of 1932.

== Present day ==
When it closed, Belle Vue left a gaping hole in the heart of the region that has never been completely replaced. It gave people a focal point, something to be proud of, a place where they could take their families and be sure of a great day out at a reasonable cost.

In 1963 the Top Lake, formerly known as the Great Lake, was filled in and a 32-lane ten-pin bowling alley built on its site, just behind the Lake Hotel. Known as the Belle Vue Granada Bowl, it opened in 1965, advertised as "the north's leading luxury centre". In 1983, after the rest of Belle Vue had closed, it was sold to First Leisure Group, and bowling continued for a time. A snooker club was built in a corner of the car park in 1985. All that remained of Belle Vue as of 2010 is the greyhound stadium and the snooker club; the original gardens and amusement park are now an industrial and residential area. A road in the housing estate, Lockhart Close, was named after circus ringmaster George Lockhart. The now mounted skin of the Zoo's tigon Maude is held in the collection of Manchester museum.

In the aftermath of Manchester's failed supercasino bid in 2008, local groups began to lobby for the construction of a "linear park" in the area, building on "the legacy of Belle Vue". It would have comprised a new zoo, deer park and amusement park.

== Music at Belle Vue ==
- 1930 (November): Maurice Chevalier played 4 concerts
- 1946 (3 February): The Hallé Orchestra and Chorus (conducted by John Barbirolli) performed Aida
- 1949 (2 October): Yehudi Menuhin and the Liverpool Philharmonic (conducted by Malcolm Sargent)
- 1956 (November): Johnnie Ray
- 1959 (9 March): Louis Armstrong and The All-Stars played at the King's Hall
- 1964 (29 March): Jerry Lee Lewis played at the Kings Hall
- 1966 (31 July): Jethro Tull
- 1966 (4 September): The Who
- 1966 (11 December): Family
- 1967 (24 May): Jimi Hendrix
- 1971 (17 August): Johnny Cash played first of 3 shows at the Kings Hall
- 1971 (30 November): Led Zeppelin played at Kings Hall
- 1972 (July): T. Rex

== Other events at Belle Vue ==
- 1949 (20 October): Comedy Concert including Peter Sellers, Richard Murdoch and Kenneth Horne
