= Ringmaster (circus) =

Circus performer

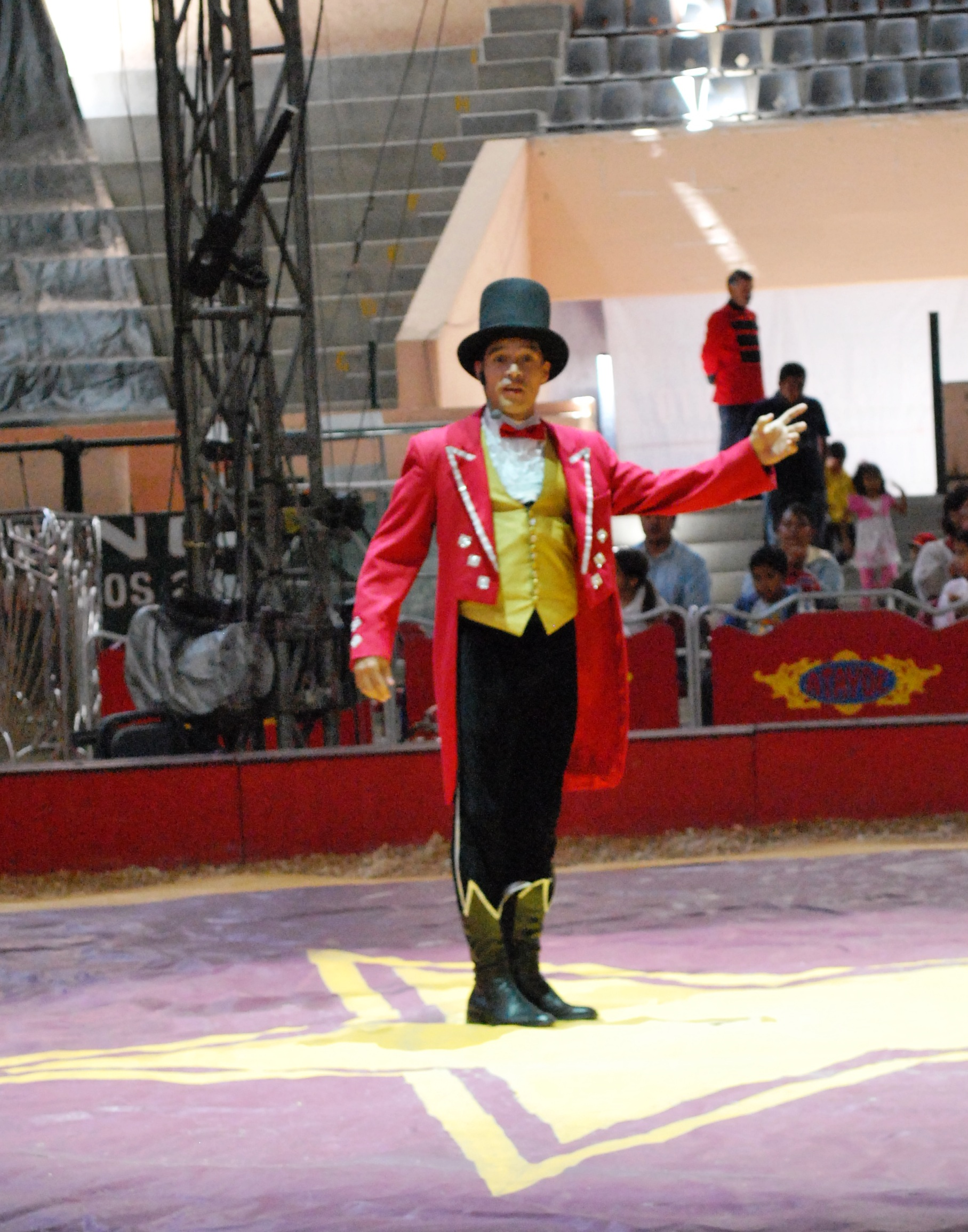
Ringmaster at a circus

A ringmaster or ringmistress, or sometimes a ringleader, is a significant performer in many circuses. Most often seen in traditional circuses, the ringmaster is a master of ceremonies that introduces the circus acts to the audience. In smaller circuses, the ringmaster is often the owner and artistic director of the circus.

== Duties and functions ==
A ringmaster introduces the various acts in a circus show and guides the audience through the experience, directing their attention to the various areas of the circus arena and helping to link the acts together while equipment is brought into and removed from the circus ring. A ringmaster may interact with, or even be involved in the elements of, some acts of the show.

It is traditionally the ringmaster's job to use hyperbole whenever possible while introducing the acts to enhance the expectations of the audience. Declarations of the "biggest", "most dangerous", "amazing", "spectacular" and similar expressions are common.

== Costume and attire ==
The traditional ringmaster costume of today consists of a black top hat, a bright tailcoat which is often red with gold trim, a waistcoat over a white shirt, breeches, and riding boots; occasionally with a bow tie, cravat, or stock tie. The outfit is designed to look as a riding habit from the 18th and early 19th centuries, and often includes a whip, a relic of when the ringmaster directed the performance; not as an announcer and host, but as director of the many equestrian acts. It is generally accepted that this costume was first adopted by George Claude Lockhart on the orders of Bertram Mills in 1928, when Lockhart worked as ringmaster for his circus at Olympia, London. A female circus leader is known as a ringmistress, and often wears a black skirt or leggings with knee-high black boots, and either the same style topcoat and tails as a ringmaster or a red blouse.

In non-English speaking countries, the ring master is known by different titles. In France, he is called "Monsieur Loyal" after the Anselme-Pierre Loyal (1753–1826), one of the first renowned circus personalities.

Around Europe and particularly in America the original Ringmaster military costume is still used, harking back to the Royal Dragoons military uniform of Newcastle-under-Lyme born Philip Astley the "Father of Modern Circus and Original Ringmaster", this look was further promoted by the release of the film "The Greatest Showman", which is very loosely based on the life of PT Barnum.

== Early function and necessity ==
The main function of a ringmaster was to direct the attention of the audience. In the days before modern lighting equipment and amplification, most acts performed mute, accompanied only by the circus' in house brass band. It was the ringmaster's loud voice that was necessary to cut through the noise, get the audiences attention and announce the next act.

== Notable ringmasters ==
- Adolph Althoff (25 June 1913 – 14 October 1998), a German ringmaster and circus owner during World War II
- Philip Astley (8 January 1742 – 20 October 1814), a British master equestrian and the "father of the modern circus"
- James Anthony Bailey (4 July 1847 – 11 April 1906), an American ringmaster and co-founder of Barnum & Bailey Circus
- P. T. Barnum (5 July 1810 – 7 April 1891), an American ringmaster and co-founder of Barnum & Bailey Circus
- Norman Barrett (b. 1935), a British ringmaster, notable for the children's TV show Right Charlie
- Captain Suresh Biswas (b.1861 – 22 September 1905), an Indian born ringmaster and soldier, notable for his prowess with big cats and his career in Brazil
- Tommy Hanlon Jr. (14 August 1923 – 11 October 2003), an American-born actor and ringmaster, notable for his career in Australia
- Johnathan Lee Iverson (b. 30 January 1976), the first African-American ringmaster of the Ringling Bros. and Barnum & Bailey Circus
- George Claude Lockhart (1885 – 8 October 1979), a British ringmaster of the Bell Vue International Circus at Belle Vue and Blackpool Tower Circus
- George William Lockhart (1849 – 24 January 1904), a British ringmaster, equestrian, former acrobat, and elephant trainer
- Henry Lytton Jr. (2 July 1906 – 16 September 1965), a British actor and singer, who served as ringmaster of the Blackpool Tower Circus

== Records ==
Norman Barrett has been noted by Guinness World Records as holding the Guinness world record for the 'longest career as a ringmaster'.
