= George William Lockhart =

George William Lockhart (real name Locker, 1849 – 24 January 1904) was a Victorian era elephant trainer. His original group of three elephants, Boney (pronounced Bonnie), Molly and Waddy, toured Great Britain's music hall scene, as well as Europe, and is reported to have appeared "500 times" at Proctor's Pleasure Palace in New York City in 1895. He is also known for his death in an elephant stampede that made two of his new elephants, Salt and Sauce, infamous until their deaths in 1952 and 1960, respectively.

He was the brother of the elephant trainer, Sam Lockhart, and the father of George Claude Lockhart, who was the first ringmaster to wear the "pink" tails and top hat in circus.

== Early career ==
He was born George William Locker in 1849. He was the eldest of three brothers and one sister. His parents were Sam Locker, Sr., a stilt-walking clown, and Hannah Pinder, sister of the pioneers of the French circus Pinder. Lockhart and his brother Sam worked together on their parents' circus, and then toured Europe as bareback riders, clowns and acrobats. An accident in 1875 brought George's acrobatic career to an end and the two brothers went separate ways to pursue individual careers.

== Boney, Molly and Waddy ==
Lockhart bought his first elephant in Burma. The elephant had originally come from Borneo and was given this name, which was later bastardised to Boney. After bringing up Boney, the Lockharts bought two more elephants they called Molly and Waddy, and formed an act. This act included various tricks that were popular at the time, including getting Boney to ride a tricycle, act as if they were playing in a band, and act out a comedy routine in a restaurant.

The act toured most of the British music hall scene, including performances in front of Queen Victoria and the royal family. According to his son, George Claude Lockhart, the act also toured Europe and Russia. In 1895 it apparently worked at Proctor's Pleasure Palace in New York "500 times". The act was sold to William Orford in 1901.

== The Cruet ==
In 1901, Lockhart bought his next troupe of elephants, called "The Cruet", from the famous animal trainer, zoo director and animal dealer Carl Hagenbeck. The group was made up of Salt, Sauce (later changed to Saucy), Mustard and Pepper. Mustard and Pepper died, suffering from dropsy symptoms. New elephants, Vinegar and Baby, were acquired. According to reports from George Claude Lockhart, the elephants stampeded and caused considerable damage at venues in Hackney, Woolwich and Chesterfield among others. Salt, referred to as "ringleader", was blamed for causing the stampedes.

On 24 January 1904, Lockhart was killed at Walthamstow Station's goodsyard (today known as Walthamstow Central station). He was crushed during a stampede, apparently by Sauce.

== Legacy ==
George Claude Lockhart, the son, went on to become what the "World's Fair" newspaper called "The Doyen of Ringmasters". On the advice of the famous circus proprietor Bertram Mills, he presented circuses in "pink" hunting tails and black top hat, and started this particular showbusiness trend. He also smoked a trademark cigar.

Elephants Salt and Sauce went on to become celebrities in their own right. They were first owned by Captain Joe Taylor, then by John "Broncho Bill" Swallow, then by Dudley Zoo, then by Tom Fossett, and then by Dennis Fossett, before Salt's death in 1952, which received a lot of local publicity in Cambridge. Sauce was later sold to Harry Coady for his circus, and finally to Billy Butlin, where she died at his Skegness holiday camp in 1960.

The elephants were frequently mentioned in local press, as they were often walked from circus ground to circus ground. They were regularly allowed to wander freely, when they sometimes got up to mischief on people's land, making the local press. Salt killed one William Aslett in 1937, who was one of her grooms, and may have killed another keeper when she worked on Paulo's Circus.

The elephants were known for starting the famous elephant trainer, Ivor Rosaire, on his independent career path as an elephant trainer.

== The Legend of Salt and Sauce ==
The Legend of Salt and Sauce (ISBN 978-1-872904-36-8) is a book written by Jamie Clubb with his father the wild animal trainer Jim Clubb, published by Aardvark Publishing in May 2008. The book begins with a prologue featuring the death of George William Lockhart and the first third of the book heavily involves him. It also has a lot of new material on the Lockhart family The book was launched at the Circus Friends Association Annual General Meeting

== Books featuring George William Lockhart ==
- "The Grey Titan, Book of Elephants", George Lockhart Jnr and W. G. Bosworth, 1938.
- "The English Circus", Ruth Manning-Sanders, 1952 (mistaken for his brother Sam).
- "Elephants in Royal Leamington Spa", Janet Storrie, Weir Books, 1990.
- "The Victorian Arena: The Performers" Volumes 1 and 2, John Turner.
- "The Legend of Salt and Sauce", Jamie Clubb, Aardvark Publishing circa 2008.

== See also ==
- Sam Lockhart
- Circus
