= John Lester (disambiguation) =

John Lester (1871–1969) was an American cricketer.

John Lester may also refer to:

- John Lester (footballer) (born 1982), Irish footballer
- John Lester (showman) (1867–1950), American showman
- John Angelo Lester (1858–1934), American educator, physician and administrator
- John Lester, one of the "Immortal Six" founders of the Ku Klux Klan

== See also ==
- Jack Lester (disambiguation)
- Jon Lester (born 1984), American former baseball pitcher
- Jon Leicester (born 1979), American former baseball pitcher
