= Riding habit =

Women's clothing for horseback riding

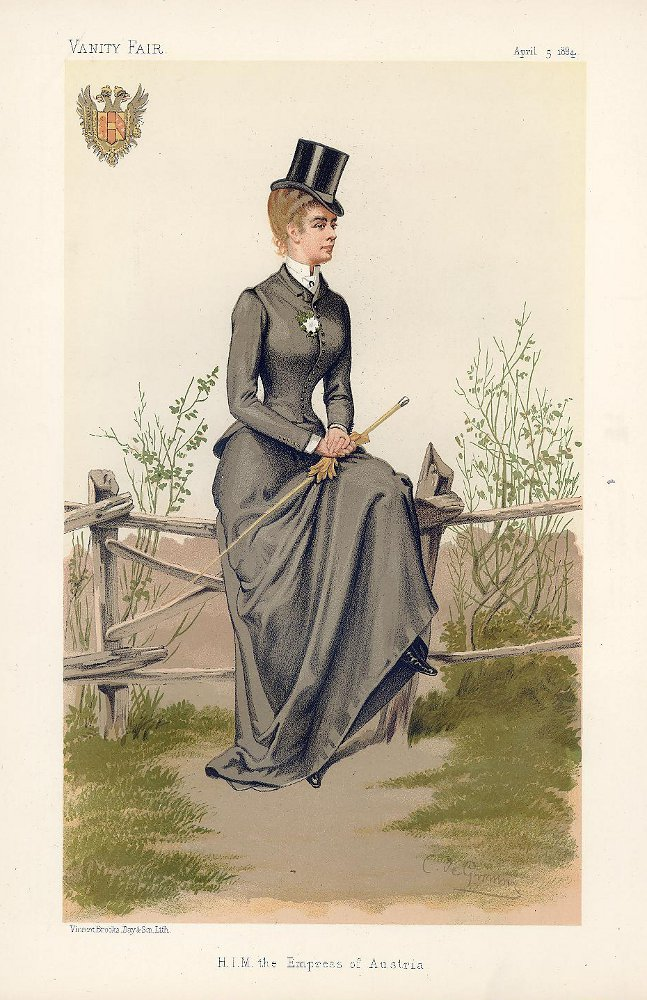
Elisabeth of Bavaria, Empress of Austria, in a riding habit, 1884

A riding habit is women's clothing for horseback riding.

Since the mid-17th century, a formal habit for riding sidesaddle usually consisted of:

- A tailored jacket with a long skirt (sometimes called a petticoat) to match
- A tailored shirt or chemisette
- A hat, often in the most formal men's style of the day (since the Victorian era, a top hat with a veil has been worn)

Low-heeled boots, gloves, and often a stock tie or cravat complete the ensemble. Typically, throughout the period the riding habit used details from male dress, whether large turned cuffs, gold trims or buttons. The colours were very often darker and more masculine than those on normal clothes. Earlier styles can be similar to the dresses worn by boys before breeching in these respects.

When high waists were the fashion, from roughly 1790 to 1820, the habit could be a coat dress called a riding coat (borrowed in French as redingote) or a petticoat with a short jacket (often longer in back than in front).

== Origins ==
High-waisted coat riding habit, 1801

In France in the 17th century, women who rode wore an outfit called a devantiere. The skirt of the devantiere was split up the back to enable astride riding. By the early 19th century, in addition to describing the whole costume, a devantiere could describe any part of the riding habit, be it the skirt, the apron, or the riding coat.

In his diary for June 12, 1666, Samuel Pepys wrote:

Walking in the galleries at White Hall, I find the Ladies of Honour dressed in their riding garbs, with coats and doublets with deep skirts, just, for all the world, like mine; and buttoned their doublets up to the breast, with periwigs under their hats; so that, only for a long petticoat dragging under their men's coats, nobody could take them for women in any point whatever; which was an odde sight, and a sight did not please me.

Two and a half centuries later, Emily Post would write:

A riding habit, no matter what the fashion happens to be, is like a uniform, in that it must be made and worn according to regulations. It must above all be meticulously trig and compact. Nothing must be sticking out a thousandth part of an inch that can be flattened in...Keep the idea of perfect clothes for men in mind, get nothing that the smartest man would not wear, and you can’t go wrong...Correct riding clothes are not fashion but form! Whether coat skirts are long or short, full or plain, and waists wasp-like or square, the above admonitions have held for many decades, and are likely to hold for many more.

== Gallery ==
Riding habits

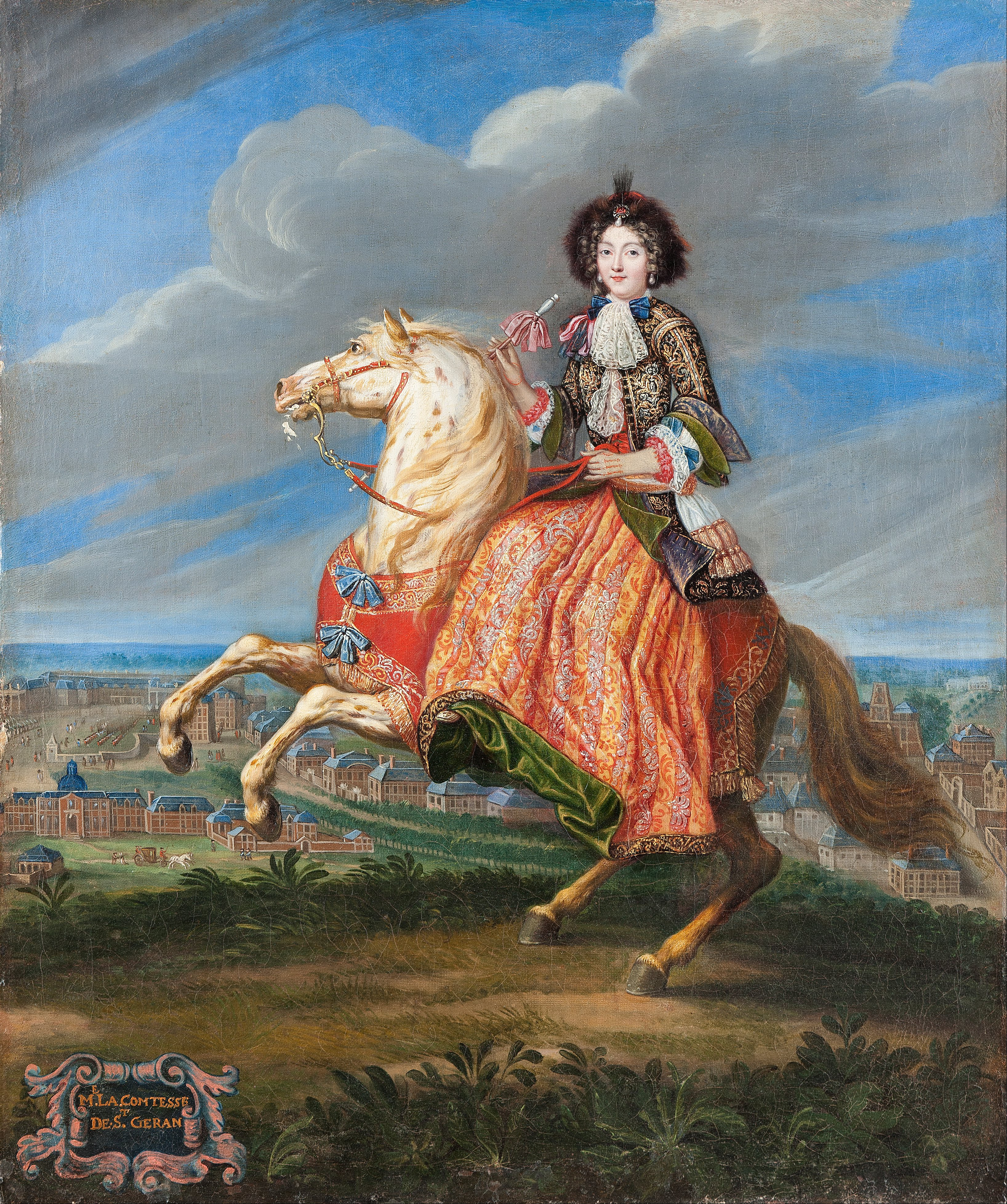
Masculine-styled jacket and waistcoat, c. 1680

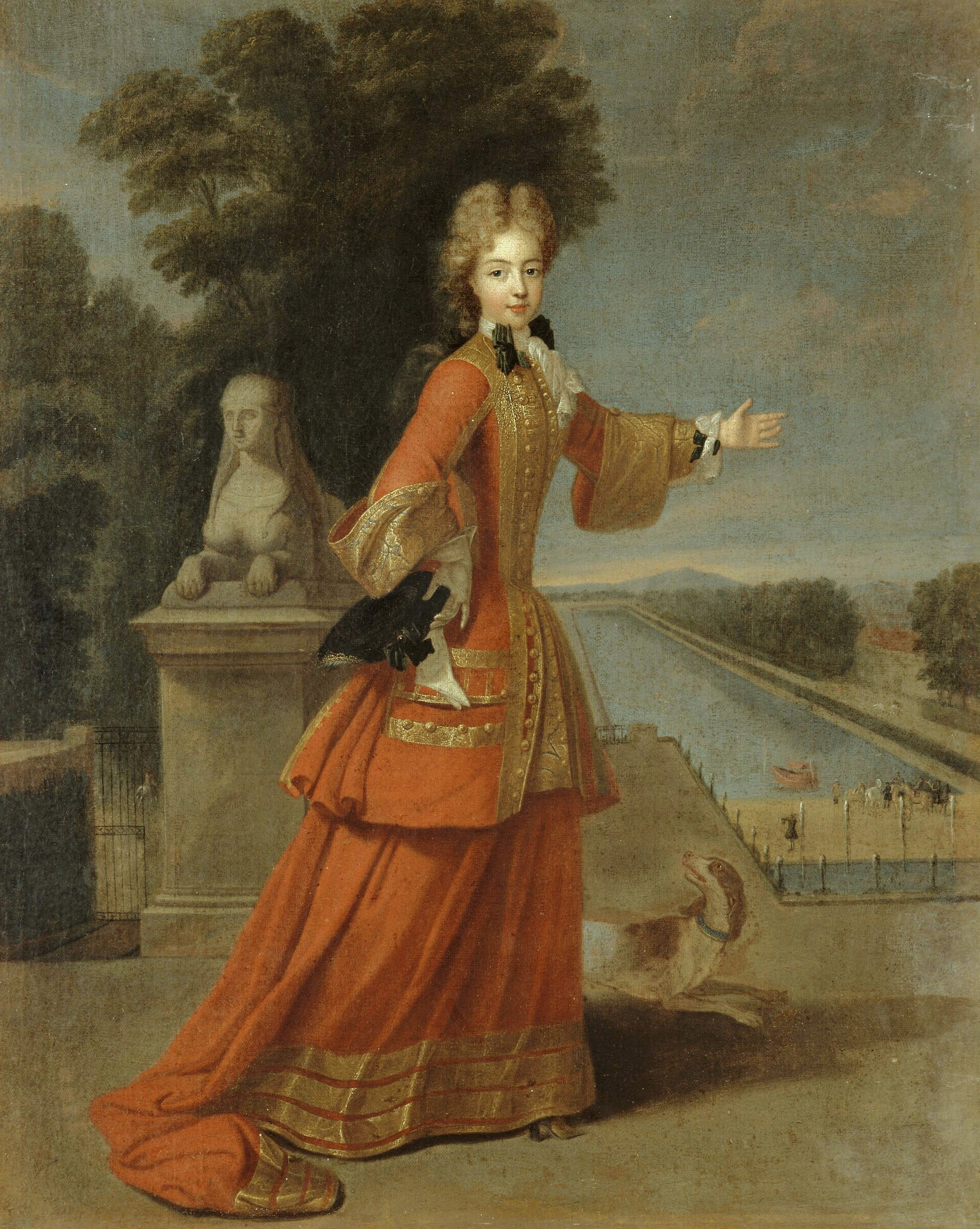
Scarlet habit, male cuffs, gold trim, buttons, early 18th century

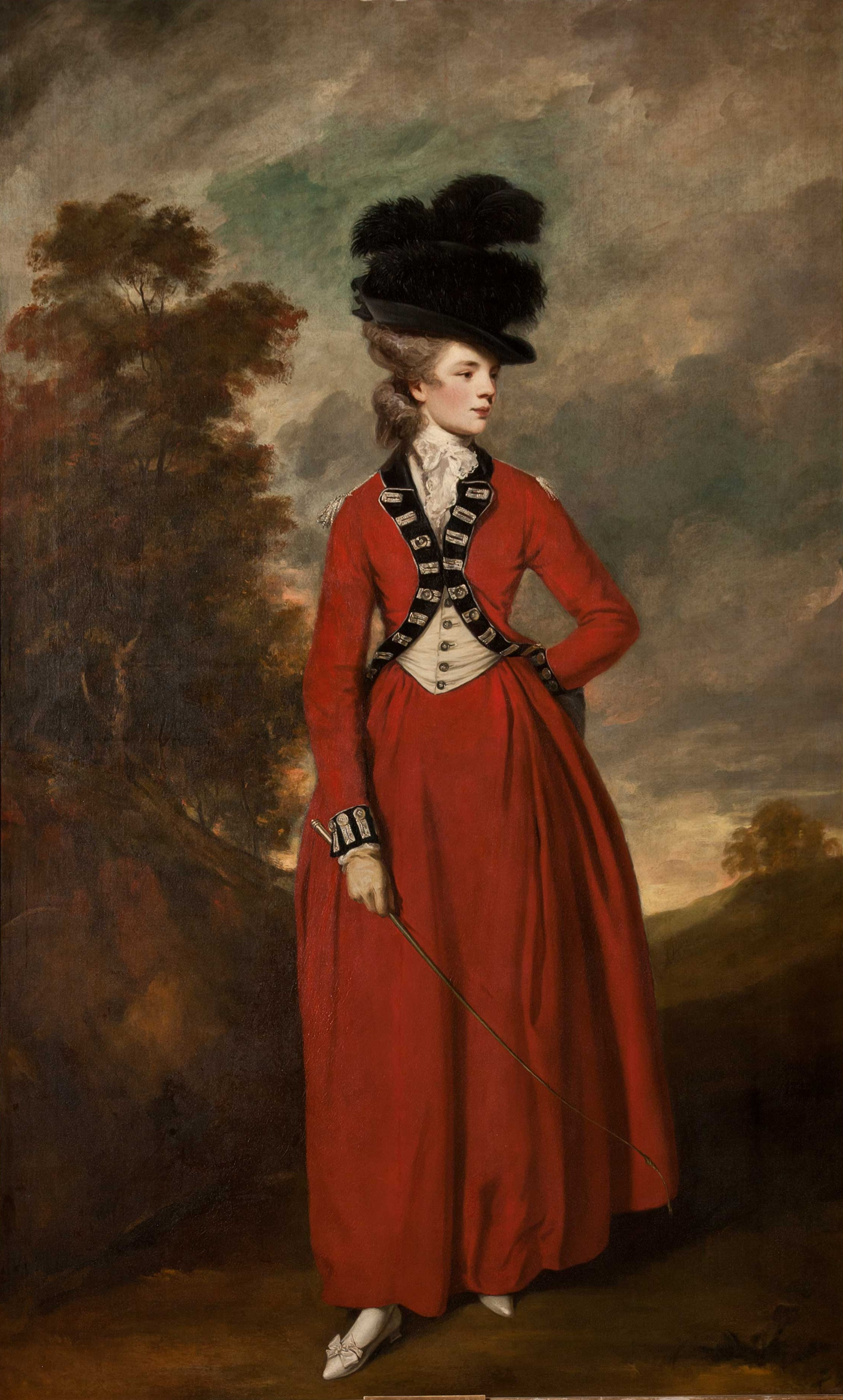
Cutaway coat, waistcoat, military details matching husband's regiment, 1779

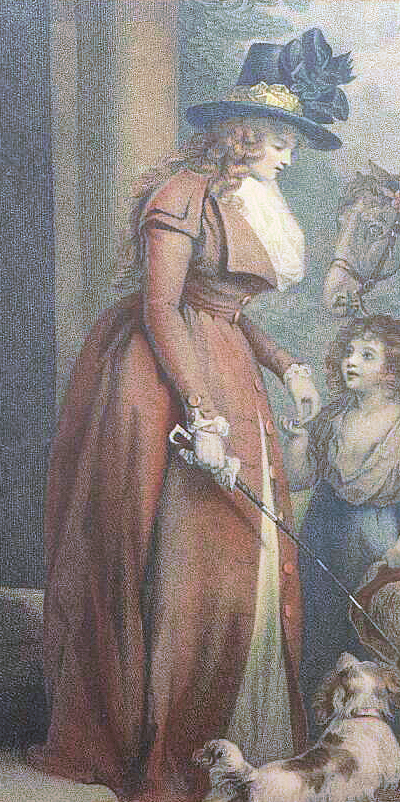
Redingote and tall hat, 1790

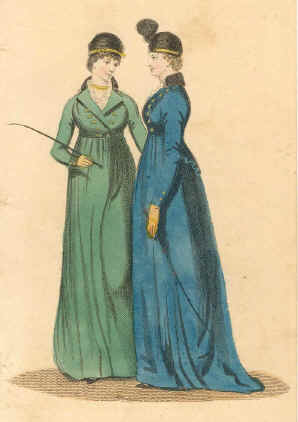
High-waisted, 1799

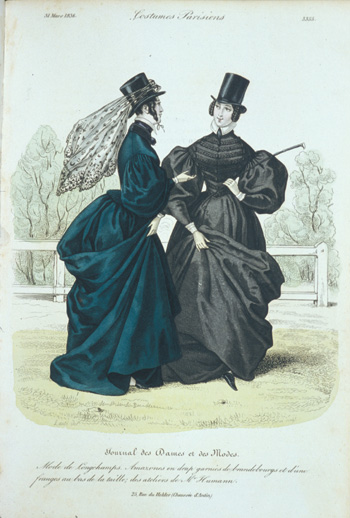
Full sleeves, 1830s

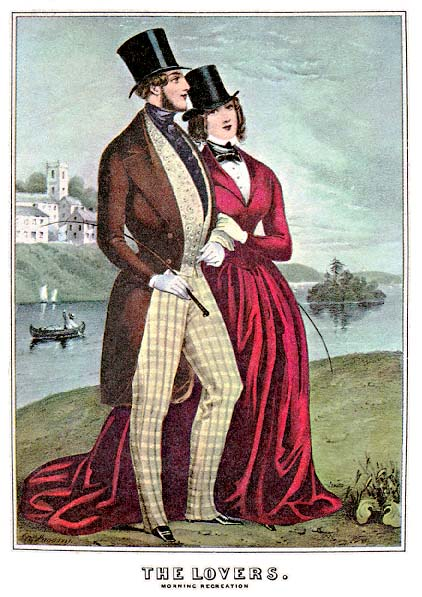
Ringlets and top hat, 1850s

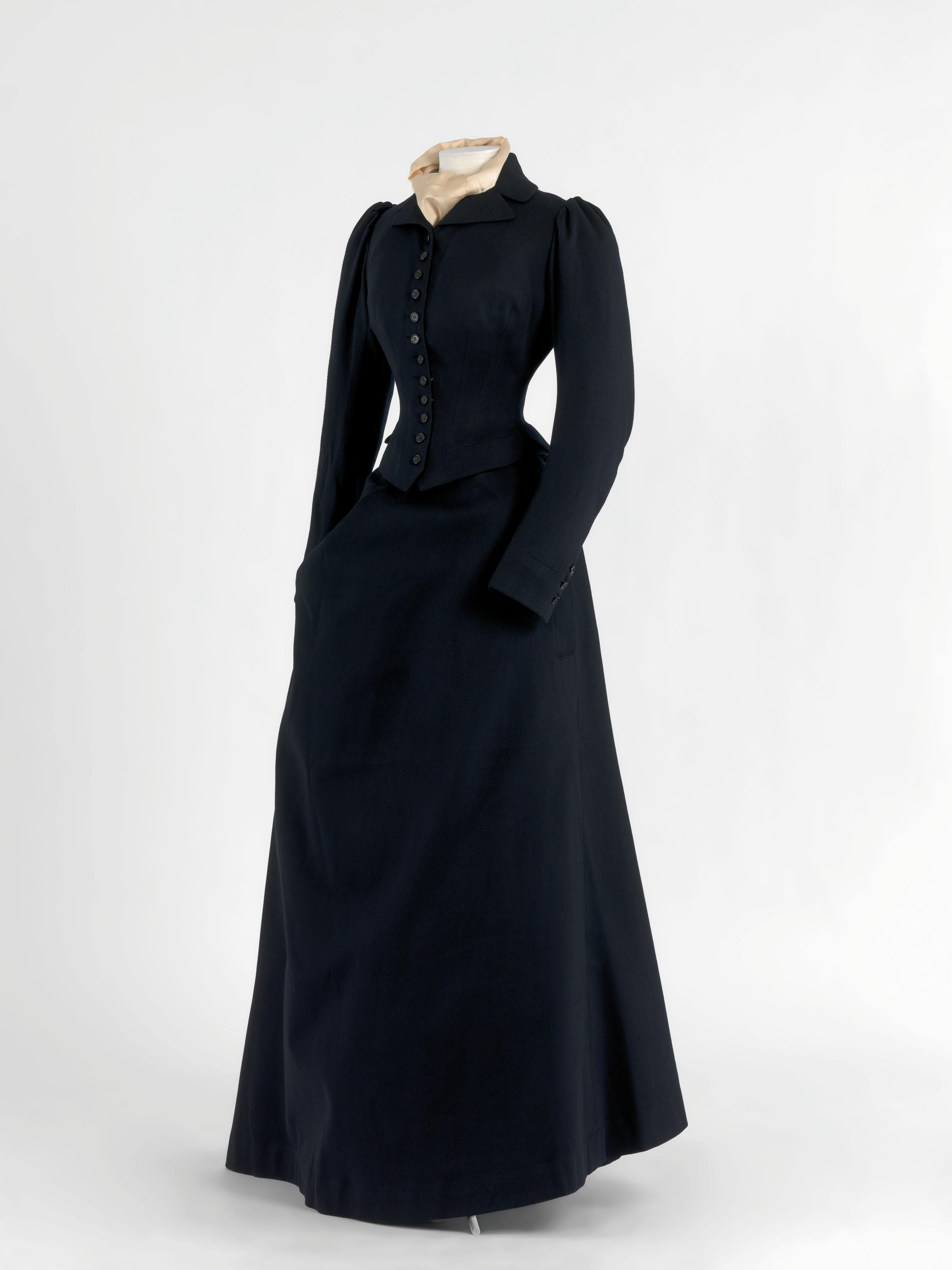
Closed skirt with stitched-in knee, 1885–1895

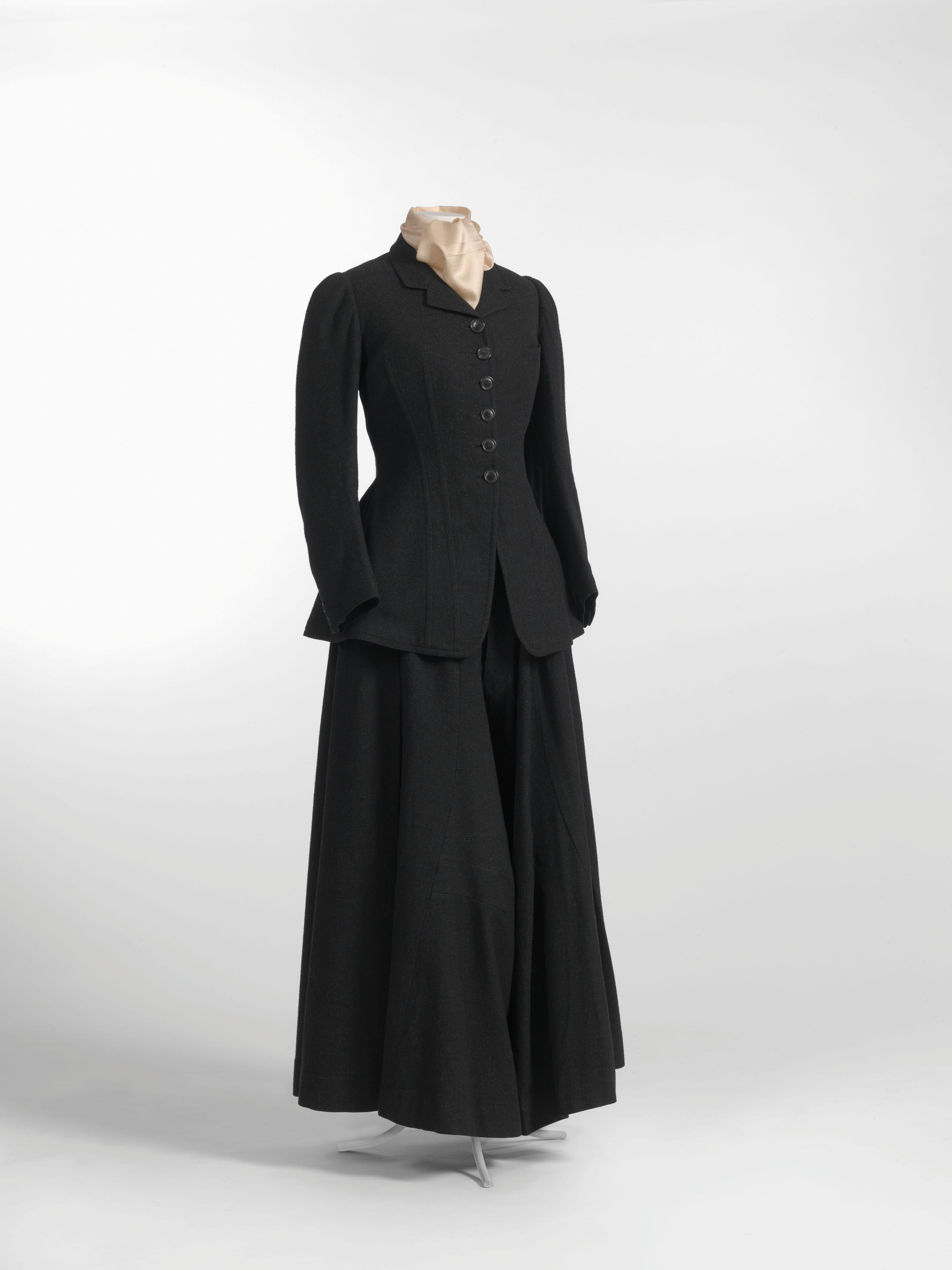
Divided skirt, 1900-1910

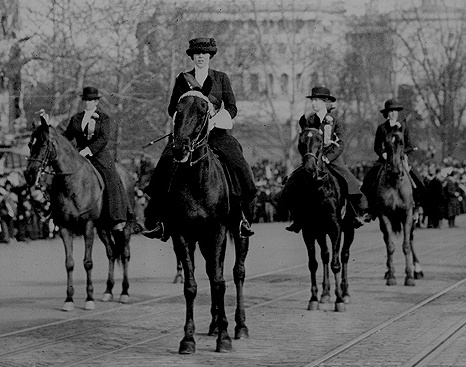
Divided skirts, 1913

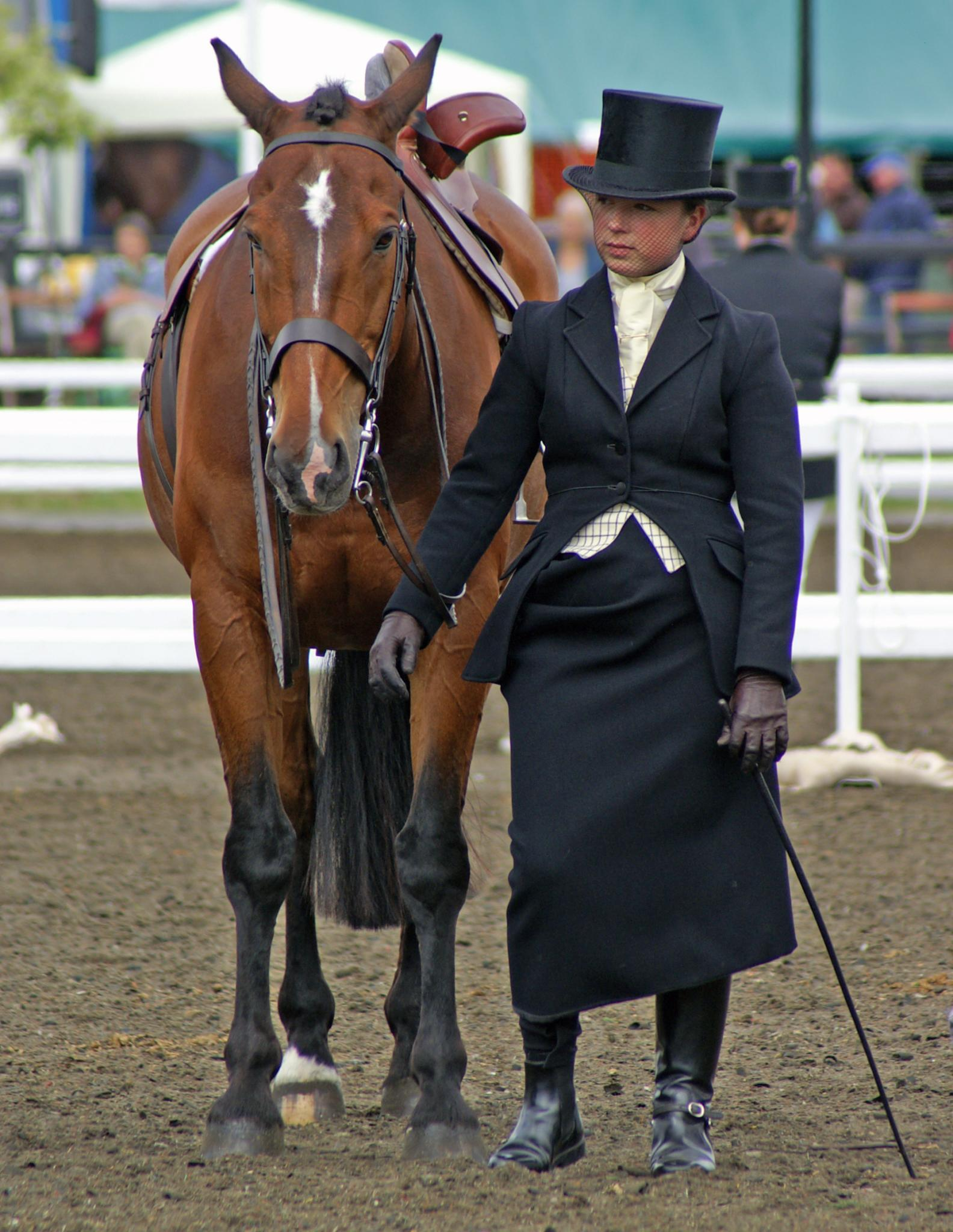
2009

== Women's redingote ==
The redingote (or redingotte, redingot) is a type of coat that has had several forms over time. The name is derived from a French alteration of the English "riding coat", an example of reborrowing.

The first form of the redingote was in the 18th century, when it was used for travel on horseback. This coat was a bulky, utilitarian garment. It would begin to evolve into a fashionable accessory in the last two decades of the 18th century, when women began wearing a perfectly tailored style of the redingote, which was inspired by men's fashion of the time. Italian fashion also picked it up (the redingotte), adapting it for more formal occasions.

The redingote à la Hussar (from French redingote à la Hussarde) was trimmed with parallel rows of horizontal braid in the fashion of Hussars' uniforms.

The style continued to evolve through the late 19th century, until it took a form similar to today's redingote. The newer form is marked by a close fit at the chest and waist, a belt, and a flare toward the hem.

Women's redingotes

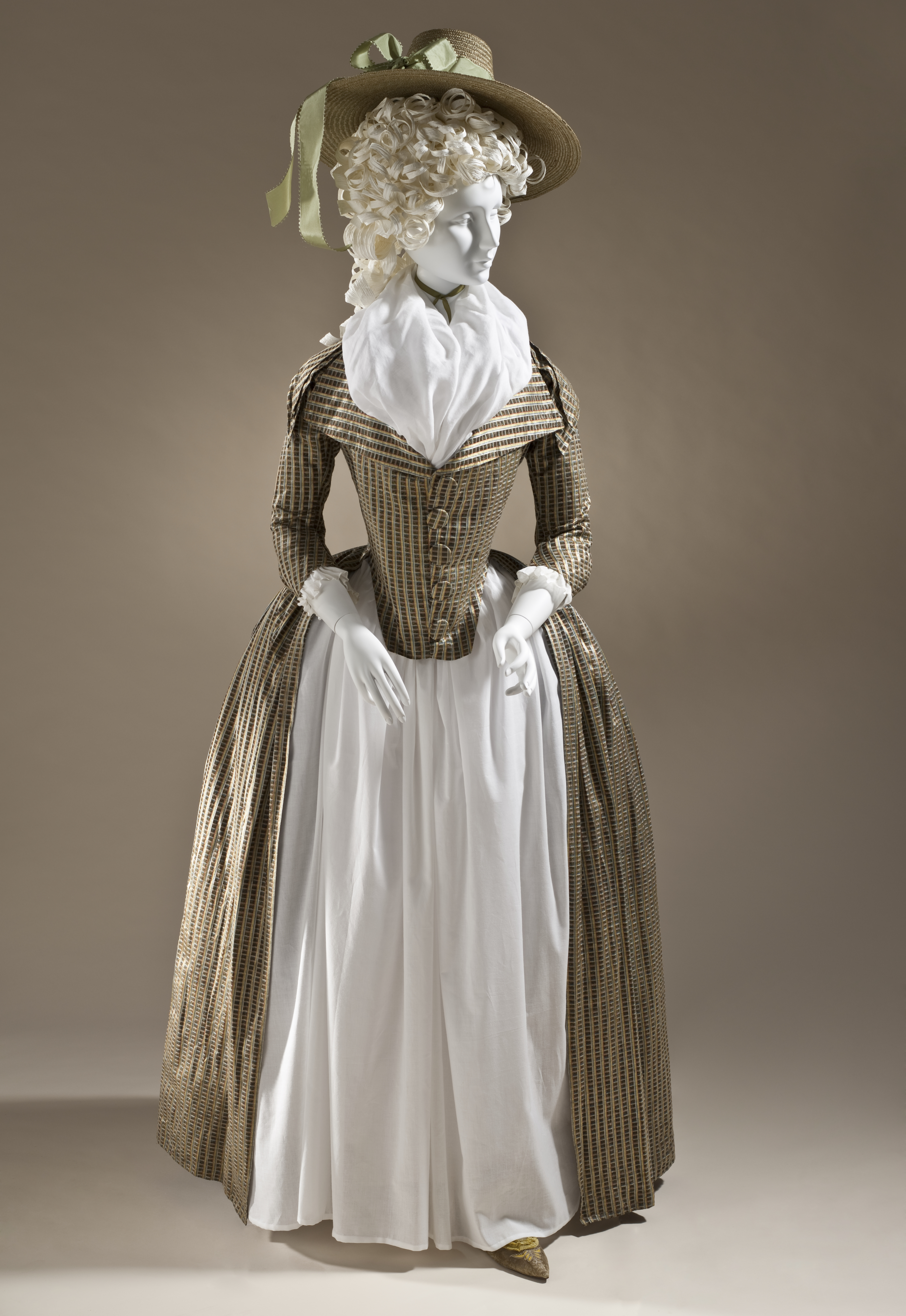
c. 1790

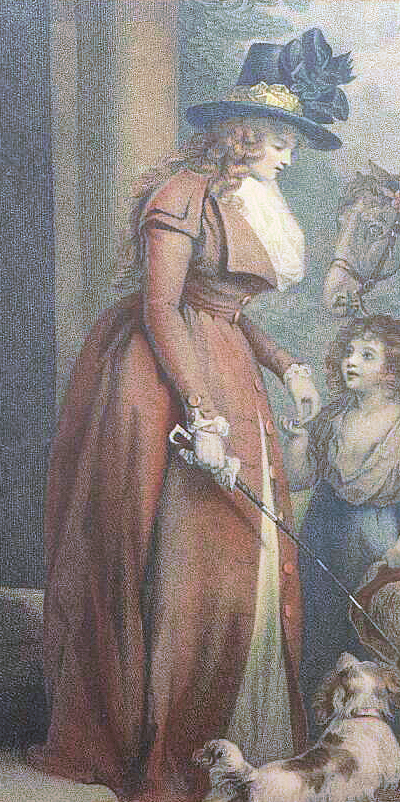
c. 1790

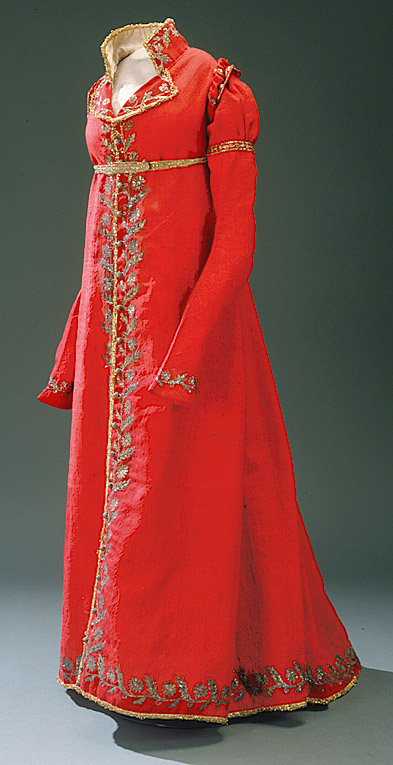
1810s

à la Hussar, 1817

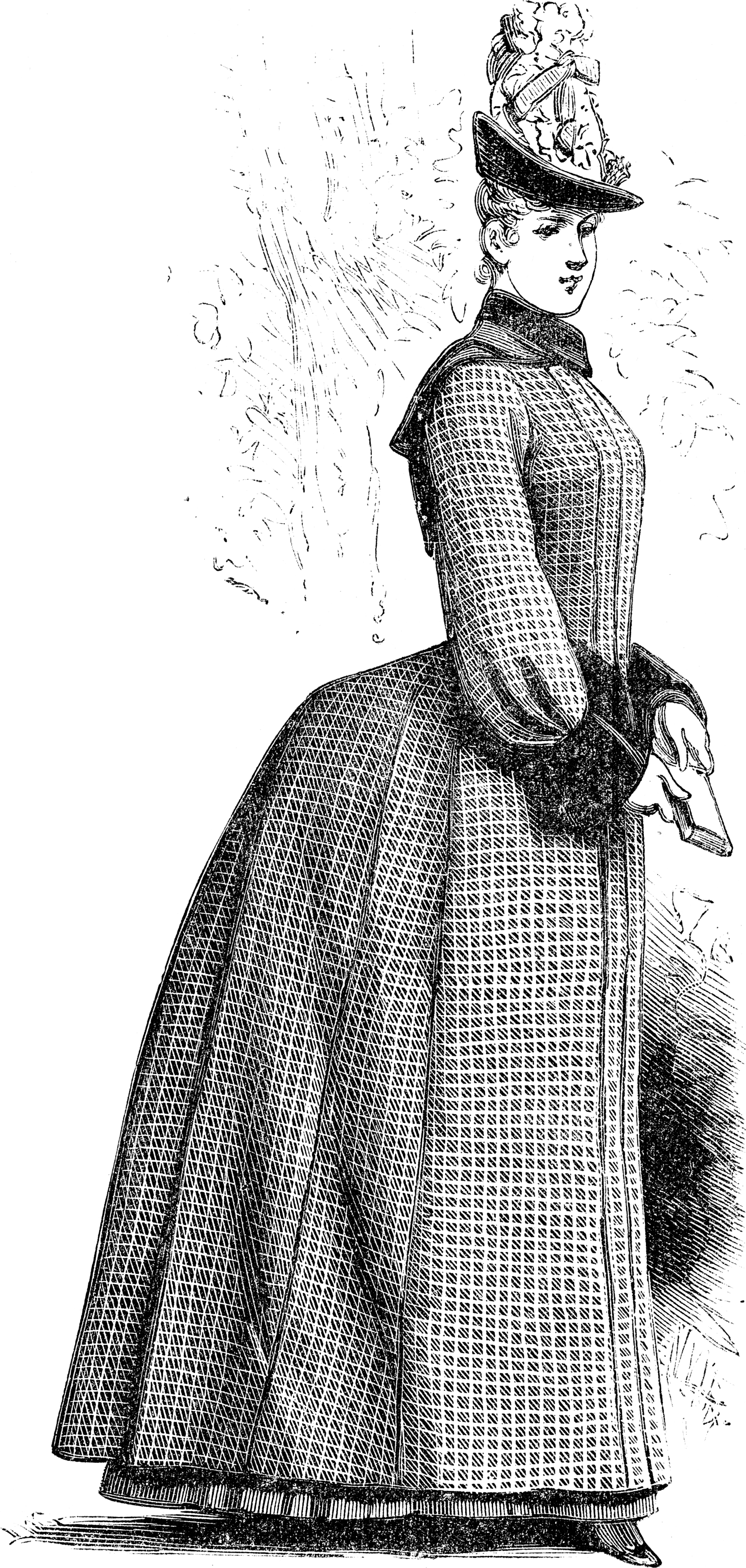
1887

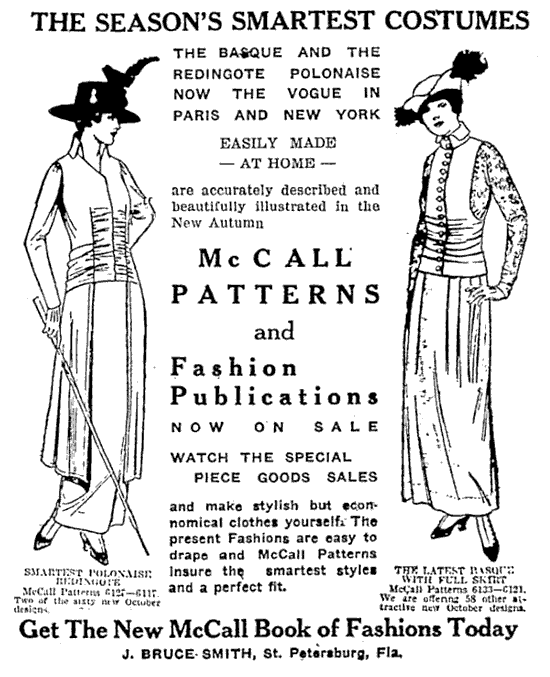
Redingote polonaise (left), 1914

== See also ==
- Riding coat
- Shadbelly
- Sidesaddle
- Women in equestrianism

== Notes ==
- Cassin-Scott, Jack, Costume and Fashion in colour 1760–1920, Blandford press, ISBN 0-7137-0740-2
- Payne, Blanche: History of Costume from the Ancient Egyptians to the Twentieth Century, Harper & Row, 1965. No ISBN for this edition; ASIN B0006BMNFS
- Takeda, Sharon Sadako, and Kaye Durland Spilker, Fashioning Fashion: European Dress in Detail, 1700–1915, LACMA/Prestel US 2010, ISBN 978-3-7913-5062-2
- Tozer, Jane and Sarah Levitt, Fabric of Society: A Century of People and their Clothes, 1770–1870, Laura Ashley Press, ISBN 0-9508913-0-4
- Pepys' diary for June 1666
- Emily Post's Etiquette, 1922, Chapter XXXIII. Dress See paragraph 40 "Riding Clothes"
- Riding Habits at the Regency Garderobe
