= Salt and Sauce =

British performing elephants

Salt (c. 1900-1952) and Sauce (c. 1900-1960) were once two of Britain's most famous and notorious performing elephants (various sources including "The English Circus and Fair Ground" by Sir Garrard Tywhitt-Drake). They were part of a four-piece elephant troupe, Lockhart's Cruet, with two other elephants, Pepper and Mustard.

== Career ==
Salt and Sauce were owned and presented by some of the most famous show business people of their era. Their owners included Carl Hagenbeck, George William Lockhart, Herbet "Captain Joe" Taylor, John "Broncho Bill" Swallow, Dudley Zoo, Tom Fossett, Dennis Fossett, Harry Coady and Billy Butlin. Their presenters included Ivor Rosaire and Emily Paulo. Formerly members and believed to be the longest surviving members of George William Lockhart's "Cruet", they were featured in various books, newspapers and magazines in their day, and are the focus of a book, The Legend of Salt and Sauce. The elephants were famed for their vast array of tricks, but also feared for their temperamental moods. Sauce (known as "Saucy" most of the time) killed George William Lockhart (her owner and trainer) in an accident at Walthamstow Station and Salt killed William Aslett (an elephant groom) when she attacked him in 1957 on Rosaire's Circus.

== Deaths ==
Despite Salt suffering dropsy symptoms that had already killed two other members of "The Cruet" she went on to live for five decades. Her death was well documented in the Cambridge local press (source: The Legend of Salt and Sauce) when she accidentally got stuck in Vauxhall Lake in Sturry, Canterbury, Kent, whilst touring with Ringland's Circus in 1952. After seven hours and with the aid of a crane she was freed from the lake, but suffered from pneumonia and died after a week. According to the local press over a hundred wreaths were left for her at the circus. It was predicted that her lifelong companion, Sauce, would die soon afterwards (source: Salt and Sauce were Separated by John D. Swallow), but she lived until 1960, dying from "natural causes".

== Media featuring Salt and Sauce ==
Salt and Sauce were booked on numerous famous British circuses (source: "World's Fair", "King Pole" magazine, various programmes, "The Victorian Arena" by John Turner and "The Legend of Salt and Sauce" by Jamie Clubb). Confirmed buildings they worked in included The Lyceum, Norwich Hippodrome, Blackpool Tower, Great Yarmouth Hippodrome and World's Fair Islington. Circuses included Tom Sylvester's, Bertram Mills' Circus, Billy Smart, Sr.'s Circus, Broncho Bill's Circus, Rosaire's Circus, Paulo's Circus, Ringland's Circus and Cody's Circus (Sauce only) among many others.

According to an article written in the "World's Fair" newspaper, the two elephants were also featured in the film Elephant Boy.

== Books featuring Salt and Sauce ==
- Grey Titan: The Book of Elephants, W. Bosworth and G. Lockhart, 1938
- The English Circus and Fair Ground, Sir Garrard Tyrwhitt-Drake, 1946
- The English Circus, Ruth Manning-Sanders, 1952
- The Circus Has No Home, Rupert Croft-Cooke
- Fairs and Circuses in the Black Country, Ned Williams
- The Victorian Arena: The Performers Volumes 1 and 2, John Turner, 1995 and 2000 respectively
- The Legend of Salt and Sauce, Jamie Clubb

== See also ==
- Samuel Lockhart, Victorian elephant trainer
- List of individual elephants
