= Harry Lester =

Harry Lester may refer to:

- The Great Lester (1878–1956) Polish-American ventriloquist
- Harry Lester (1895–1993), American comedy musician, son of John Lester (showman)
- Justin Lester (wrestler) (born 1983), American Greco-Roman wrestler
