= Jean Pierre Ginnett =

French circus proprietor (1798–1861)

Jean Pierre Ginnett (né Ginet; 6 August 1798 – January 1861) was a French-born circus proprietor working in Britain, who founded the Ginnett circus dynasty.

== Biography ==
He was born in Solaize, France. According to family tradition, he and other members of the family fought in the French cavalry at Waterloo in 1815, and were captured. As prisoners of war, they were shipped to England and later released. Ginnett remained in England, and set up a show with performing ponies and canaries at Ludgate Circus in London. He also worked as a horse breeder, probably in association with equestrian performer Andrew Ducrow. In 1825, he married Ann Partridge of Leigh-on-Sea, in London.

He founded Ginnett's Circus in Nottingham in 1841. By 1858, Ginnett's touring operation was billed as "a mammoth circus & matchless troupe of equestrians [with a] stud of 70 blood horses and fairy ponies." The show included re-enactments of Dick Turpin's ride to York, and of the storming of Delhi, together with clowns.

Jean Pierre Ginnett died in London in 1861 and is buried in Kensal Green Cemetery.

== Later developments ==
His son, John Frederick Ginnett (1825 in London – 1892) and three grandsons Claude (b. Bath, 1857–1911), Frederick Emile (b. Sheffield, 1859–1924) and Albert (b. Southampton, 1864–1894) followed him in developing the circus. His daughter was the equestrian circus performer Marie Macarte and his great-granddaughters the high-wire and strongwoman act the Macarte Sisters.

In 1876, the Ginnetts' first permanent circus building was opened at Park Crescent Place in Brighton; it later became the Gaiety Theatre before being demolished in about 1930. In the 1890s, the Brighton Hippodrome was built to commemorate the golden jubilee of the founding of the circus. John Frederick Ginnett is buried in the family vault in Woodvale Cemetery and Crematorium in Brighton.

The circus itself operated until the 1930s, and was later revived by family members.

== See also ==
- Samuel Lockhart, elephant trainer at Ginnett's Circus
