= Norman Barrett (ringmaster) =

British circus ringmaster

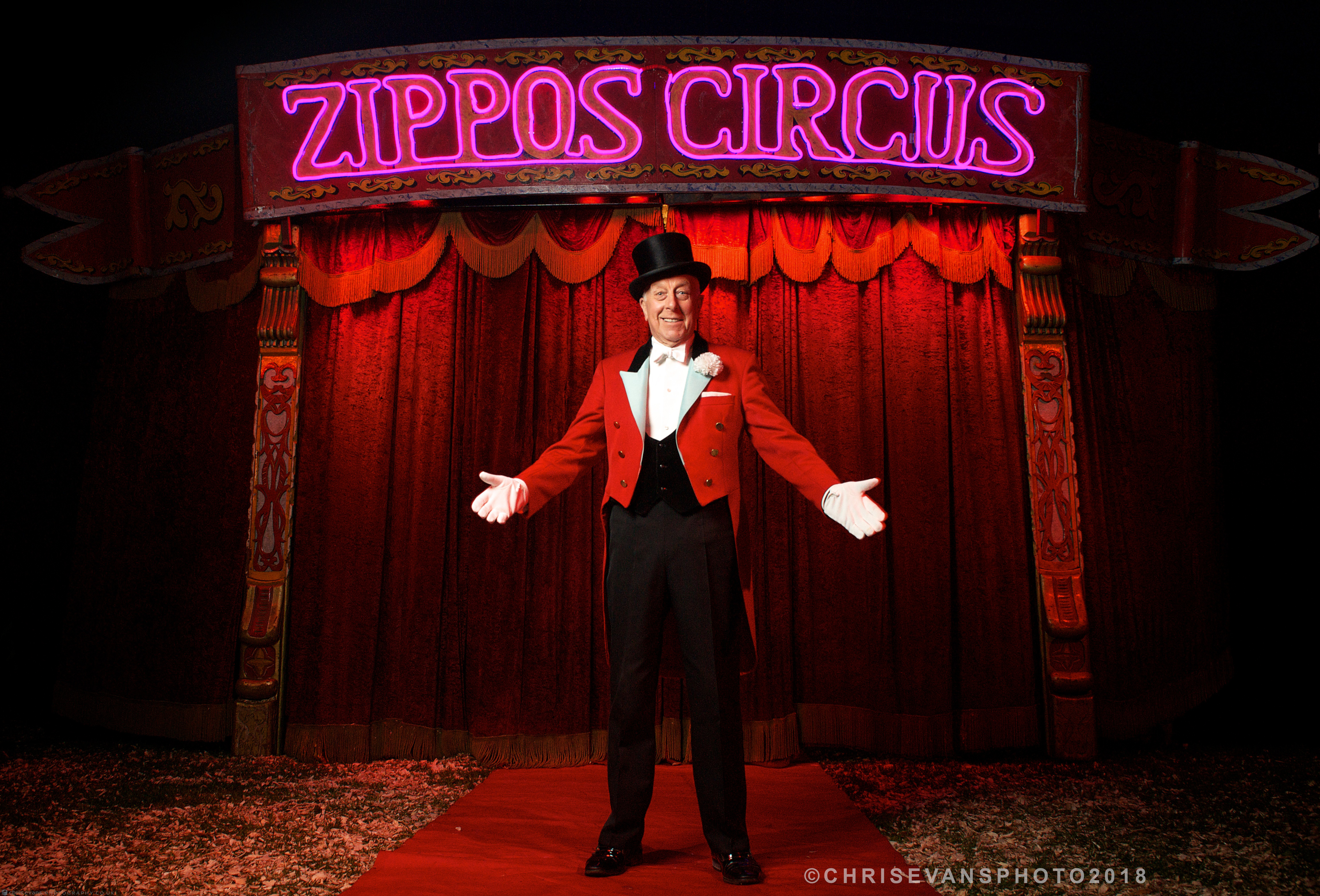
Barrett at Zippos Circus in 2013

Norman Barrett MBE (born 20 December 1935) is a veteran British circus ringmaster who made many appearances on television, notably with Charlie Cairoli in the children's television series Right Charlie.

He is well-known for his act with performing budgerigars. As a younger man, he was a bareback rider, famous for his Ben-Hur act where he would stand astride two horses while others ran in the opposite direction between his legs. From 1955 to 1966 he toured in the UK with the Bertram Mills Circus.

He was awarded the MBE in the 2010 New Year honours list.

Barrett worked with all the world's great circuses and spent 25 years at Blackpool Tower Circus between 1966 and 1990. He was also the ringmaster of the Belle Vue Christmas Circus at Bell Vue in Manchester in the 1970s and early 1980s.

Barrett was the subject of This Is Your Life in 1990 when he was surprised by Michael Aspel at the Tower Circus in Blackpool.

Barrett was ringmaster for the well-known Zippo's Circus that toured the USA between 1998 and 2001, as well as touring England and Scotland at other times.

In 2011 Barrett appeared on Sooty performing with his budgies alongside Sooty and Sweep in the episode “Who’s a clever bird.”

In 2013, Barrett appeared as the Mystery Guest on Russell Howard's Good News, series 8 episode 6.

Barrett, with his budgies, appeared as a guest on Sunday Night at the Palladium in May 2015 and took this cabaret act particularly to Germany and Belgium.

Norman was also the ringmaster of the made-for-television Circus World Championships which ran on ITV and BBC Television for many years.
