= John Lester (showman) =

American showman (1867–1950)

- 1920 passport photo
- Born: October 8, 1867; Sullivan County, New York, U.S.
- Died: October 27, 1950 (aged 83); London, England
- Occupations: Showman, impresario
- Years active: 1880s–1940s

John Lester (October 8, 1867 – October 27, 1950) was an American traveling carnival showman and variety show impresario. He headed a family of entertainers who often performed together, and in later life worked mainly in Britain. His sons Harry (born Harrold Worth Lester; July 9, 1895 – July 4, 1993) and Burton Lester (born Burton Conklin Lester; September 27, 1897 – January 10, 1955) were also prominent variety show entertainers. The family performed a wide variety of acts, but were most notable for their midget shows, and for Harry Lester's comedy hillbilly music performances.

== Early life and career ==
John Lester was born in Sullivan County, New York. He began his career with the Ringling Bros. and Barnum & Bailey Circus. As a showman, he then ran a variety of ventures ranging from a dramatic repertory company to a Wild West show. With his wife Clara (née Bausch; born in Chicago, Illinois, 1874–1957), and his two sons Harry (born in Fort Worth, Texas, in 1895) and Burton (born in Chicago in 1897), he toured the United States presenting a family act, all performing together from around 1908. They sang, played a wide variety of instruments, and performed acrobatics, tightrope walking, and a trapeze act. In 1910, they worked on Mississippi riverboats, and in 1914 toured in Australia and South Africa.

The family made their London debut at the Victoria Palace Theatre in 1915. Billed as The Four Aerial Lesters, they performed on trapezes while playing music, as "The Band Upside-Down". They stayed in Britain and became known for a series of novelty acts, turning their hands to whatever was the current popular fad. In 1919, they performed a form of jazz, as "The Frisco Five". The Era described their act as "The Jazz and all about it by five who know". Harry and Burton Lester wrote "Everybody's Jazzing Now", recorded by the Manhattan Jazz Band in 1919. A 1925 advertisement for the troupe, showing a 12-piece band on stage, bills the show as "John Lester's Jazz Round-Up, featuring Harry & Burton Lester and their Cowboy Syncopators". The family produced and performed "dozens of different acts and shows", including "Shot to the Moon", described as "a science-fiction extravaganza", and two acts focusing on the audience's growing appetite for movies, "Hollywood Follies", and "Film-Faces".

== Little People Circus ==
Burton Lester married in London in 1923, and Harry Lester followed suit in 1925. Around the same time, John Lester formed one of the first troupes of "midget" performers in Britain. This was a success, and was based at "Midget Town" at Blackpool Tower for four years from 1925. The troupe's performances featured up to 40 little people - both achondroplastic dwarfs and others of restricted height - together with several ponies and an elephant. John Lester returned several times to the United States, where he toured with his circus. By the late 1920s, the two brothers, Harry and Burton, took over the "midget circus" from their father, with a 1928 "Mammoth Midgets Circus" show at Belle Vue Gardens in Manchester credited to the Lester Bros. Members of the troupe in later years included "Little Billy" Merchant, who joined in 1937, and Kenny Baker, who joined in 1951.

== Wild West revue ==
Harry and Burton also started working with their own act, billing themselves as "The Famous Cowboy Entertainers", and developed the comedy musical side of their performances. By the late 1930s, as Burton concentrated on presenting the midget circus, the cowboy act had developed into a Wild West revue featuring Harry Lester and His Hayseeds, performing mostly novelty pastiche versions of Western and hillbilly music, with songs such as "Roll Along, Covered Wagon" and "'They're Tough, Mighty Tough, in the West". The group became popular on BBC Radio, with a 1939 broadcast crediting band members as Babs May, Goofus Brown ("the yodelling nitwit"), 'Pop' Tom Soulsby, Jack Leng, Dug Duffton, Ted North, and Freddie 'Trump' Wood. At the start of each show Lester would introduce his band by saying "Yes, folks, its your Country Cousins come to town!". The ensemble regularly toured throughout the 1940s, often on the same bills as Burton Lester's Midgets, and in 1946 Harry Lester's Hayseeds appeared in the Royal Variety Performance at the London Palladium.

== Later lives and deaths ==
In the Second World War, John Lester went back to the United States, where he instructed electrical workers in the Henry Kaiser shipyards in California. He died in London in 1950 at the age of 83, and his son Burton Lester died in 1955, aged 57. The Hayseeds performed together in variety shows, often billed as "Your Country Cousins", until Harry Lester's retirement in 1957. He died in Weymouth, Dorset, in 1993, at the age of 97.

== See also ==
- Henry Behrens
