= Robert George John Francis Fossett =

Robert George John Francis Fossett (11 November 1922 – 1 June 2004), also known as Jacko Fossett, was an English clown who performed under the name of Jacko the Clown. With his partner of 30 years, Little Billy Merchant, he travelled extensively on the European circus circuit. The pair were regular performers at the Belle Vue Christmas Circus until Merchant's retirement in 1979.

Fossett was born in Hull, where his father, also known as Jacko (causing Fossett to refer to himself as "Jacko of Jacko") was appearing at a fair. He was educated in Northampton. In the Second World War he enlisted in the Royal Air Force in 1940 and later appeared with ENSA, as a camp concert entertainer. He demobilised in 1946.

Sydney the boxing kangaroo was another of Jacko's regular partners, although there were in fact eight different animals over the years.

Fossett appeared briefly as a clown in The Rolling Stones Rock and Roll Circus, which was filmed in 1968 but delayed for release until 1996.

He was a descendant of the circus proprietor "Sir" Robert Fossett, 1824–1875, the knighthood being self-proclaimed and apparently considered hereditary.

After suffering a heart attack in the ring, he retired to Skegness. Jacko was presented with the World's Fair's Lifetime Achievement Award in 2000. Described by circus historian J. M. Turner as "probably the last of the traditional British clowns", Jacko died suddenly on 1 June 2004, at the age of 81.

Fossett married in 1960 Constance Reid, one of the "Reid Sisters" acrobatic duo, who survived him.
