= Jack Lester (disambiguation) =

Jack Lester may refer to:

- Jack Lester, football player
- Jack Lester (boxer), American heavyweight boxer

== See also ==
- John Lester (disambiguation)
- Jack Lester King
