= Manchester Zoological Gardens =

- Interactive map of Manchester Zoological Gardens
- 53°30′37″N 2°15′31″W
- Date opened: 1838
- Date closed: 1842
- Location: Broughton, Salford, England

The Manchester Zoological Gardens opened in 1838, on a 15-acre (6 ha) site between Broom Lane and Northumberland Street in Broughton, now in Salford, England. Attractions included a Grand Menagerie, a lake, a maze, an archery ground, and a series of landscaped walks. The gardens were laid out by a company of local business men, on land rented from the Rev. John Clowes of Broughton Hall, who had become interested in botany and horticulture in later life. The gardens competed with John Jennison's Belle Vue Zoological Gardens opened three years earlier, but the venture was commercially unsuccessful and closed in 1842. Some of the animals were acquired by the Belle Vue Zoo, others went to London Zoo and to Hampton Court.
