= Henry Behrens =

British performer

- Born: c. 1895; Brazil
- Died: 1961
- Other name: Colonel Peewee
- Occupation: Performer
- Known for: Being promoted as the world's smallest man
- Height: 30 in (76 cm)
- Spouse: Emmie Behrens

Henry Behrens (born c. 1895 – 1961), also known as Colonel Peewee, was a British performer known for being recognized during his lifetime as the smallest man in the world. Standing at approximately 30 inches (76 cm) tall, he traveled extensively across various countries and was promoted as the world's smallest man.

== Life ==
Details about Henry Behrens's early life, including his exact birth date, place of birth, and family background, are not widely documented. He was reportedly born in Brazil from German parents, although later lived and worked in the United Kingdom. His parents were of average stature.

== Career ==
Behrens entered show business after being discovered by Burton Lester, a talent scout and showman who recruited performers of short stature for his travelling company. Lester signed Behrens to the troupe, in which he performed under the stage name Colonel Peewee.

Over the following decades, Behrens toured internationally and was regularly promoted as the "world's smallest man". Standing approximately 30 in (76 cm) tall, he remained associated with the title during the 1940s and 1950s. He spoke four languages fluently.

By the 1950s, Behrens was appearing in newspapers and newsreels. A British Pathé film titled Smallest Man showed him beside adults and everyday objects to demonstrate his stature. Although he had settled in Worthing, West Sussex, he continued to be identified publicly as the world's smallest man.

== Personal life ==
Behrens was married to a woman named Emmie, who was 40 inches tall and from Leeds. The couple married in 1932 and resided in Worthing, West Sussex, England.

== Death ==
Behrens died in 1961 at the age of 66.
