= William Alfred Merchant =

William Alfred Merchant (31 July 1919 – 26 May 2001), was an English dwarf clown who performed under the name of "Little Billy" Merchant. Born in a workhouse in Barton Hill, Bristol, Merchant was abandoned by his parents as a young child and brought up in an orphanage in Bristol. As an adult, he was only 42 inches (1.1 m) tall.

Merchant was fascinated by his local variety theatre, the Bristol Empire, where a chance encounter in 1937 resulted in his recruitment into John Lester's troupe of midgets. He subsequently joined Joe Boganny's band of acrobatic dwarves, with whom he appeared in many of the leading variety venues of the time. During the Second World War Merchant worked as an aircraft fitter for the Bristol Aeroplane Company, but he managed to spend the 1944 summer season at Chessington Zoo Circus, partnering the clown Fiery Jack (real name Fred Zetina). His partnership with Jacko the Clown lasted for 30 years, during which time the pair traveled extensively on the European circus circuit. They were regular performers at the Belle Vue Christmas Circus until Merchant's retirement in 1979. They also spent six summer seasons at the Great Yarmouth Hippodrome.

Merchant moved to a retirement home in Skegness in 1979. He received a lifetime achievement award from the Circus Friends' Association of Great Britain in 2000.
