= Shadbelly =

Type of riding coat

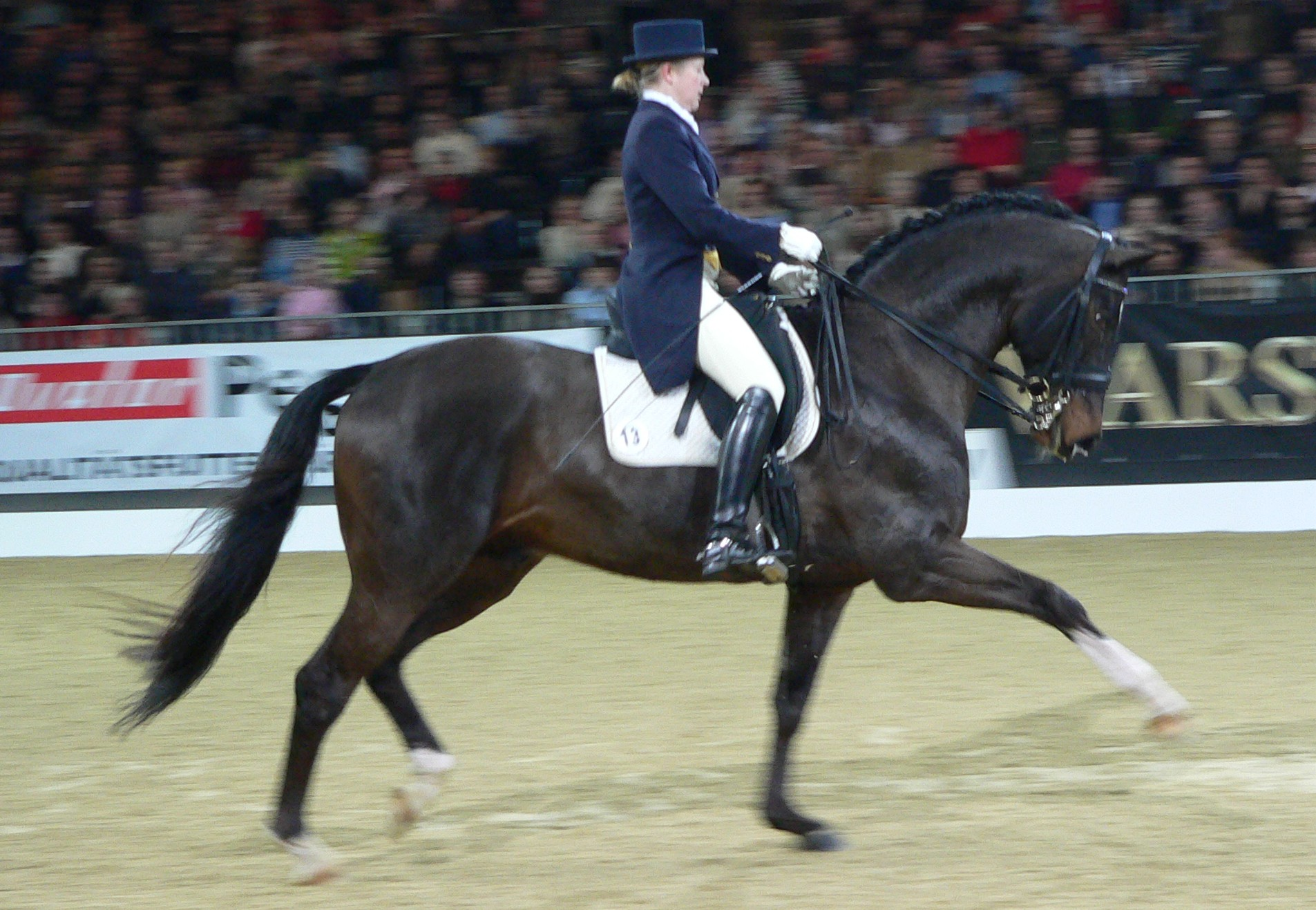
Navy shadbelly worn with white gloves, tall boots, and spurs: note the yellow points and tails; the horse is performing dressage

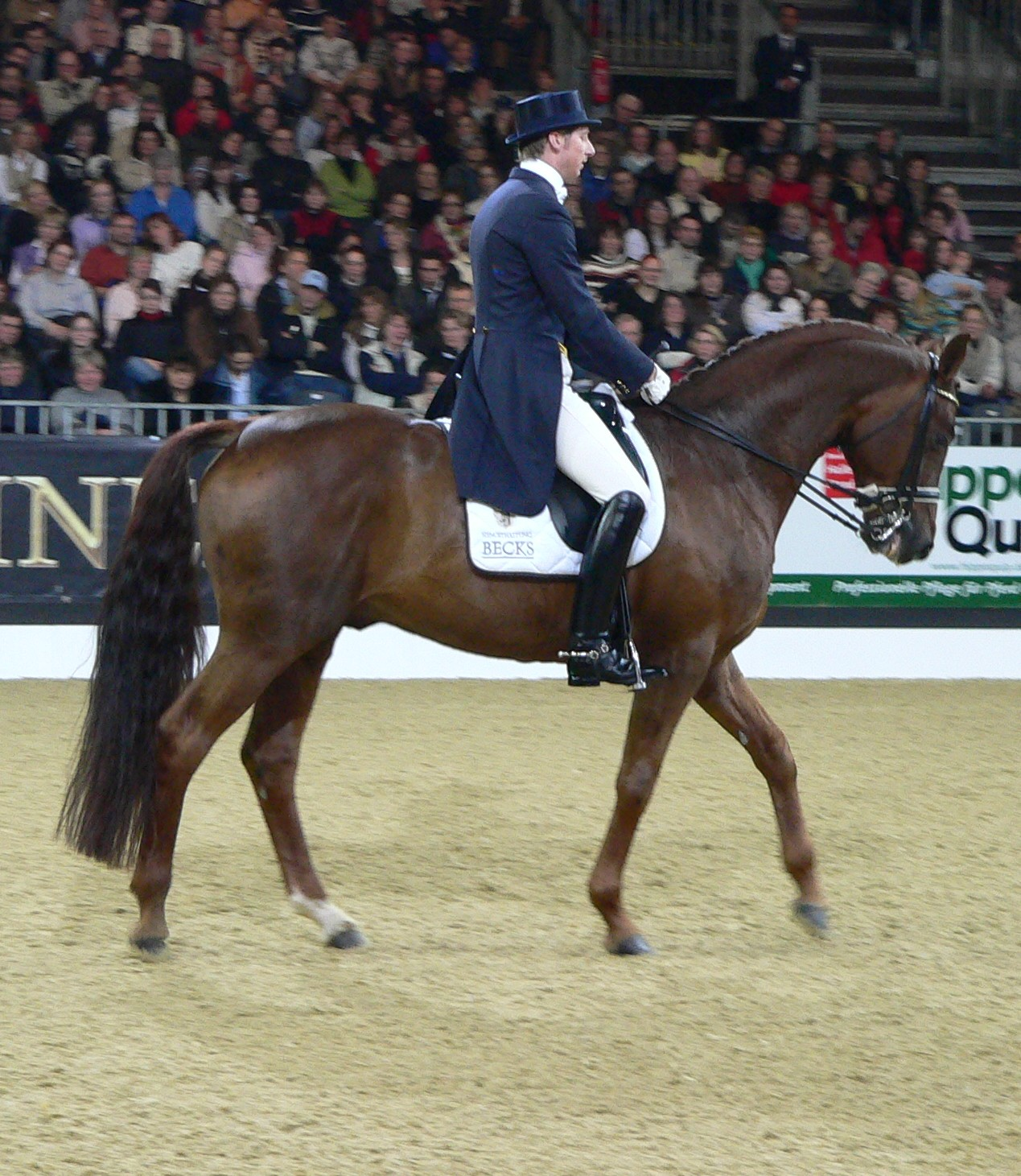
Rider wearing a shadbelly and a top hat, with white gloves, tall boots, and spurs

A shadbelly or shad-belly (North American English) is a type of riding coat worn in certain equestrian situations by members of fox hunts, by dressage riders, by eventers (in the dressage phase of the higher levels), and occasionally by other hunt seat riders. Shadbellies are also standard attire for the show hack classes at certain breed shows in the United States and in Canada.

This coat is considered an element of very formal riding attire, and therefore reserved for the most formal forms of equestrianism. When used in the classic hunt, shadbellies should not be worn by young riders, despite any trend or availability.

== Terminology ==
The shadbelly coat is part of a formal wear category known as the tailcoat. The male version of the shadbelly is sometimes called a "weaselbelly".

The compound word "shadbelly" was also once spelled "shad belly" (most likely in reference to the fish), and the coat is also sometimes referred to as a "swallowtail". Essentially, the space between the original two-word spellings has been removed, but not their meanings.

Today, "swallowtail" and "shadbelly" are used interchangeably for fox hunting in the United States, but "shadbelly" is the primary term used in various horse show disciplines.

== History ==
The design is historically linked to the United Kingdom, where the famous dandy and trendsetter Beau Brummell popularized the style for daywear during the Regency period. By the 1860s the formal tailcoat was used almost exclusively for formal evening wear. The Amish and Quakers wore the shadbelly to church functions, and European royalty wore the coat for formal occasions and portraits as well as for riding horseback. The ease of mounting a horse while wearing the coat allowed the design to spread.

The earliest recorded use of a shadbelly-type coat is in early Christianity, when Chaldean Christian priests wore coats representing the body of a fish.

== Description ==
A shadbelly is usually black in color, although navy is becoming popular, and deep green is also occasionally seen in some nations. It has tails, double buttons, and either is worn over a vest (British English: waistcoat) of canary yellow or, particularly when worn in hot weather, has false yellow points peeking out under the cut-away front, to simulate the look of a vest. Vests or vest points of colours other than canary yellow are becoming more popular. Generally a white shirt with a ratcatcher collar and tied stock tie (a type of simple cravat) is standard.

Traditionally, a shadbelly is worn with a top hat, white breeches and black riding boots. In recent years, some governing organizations have required that riders wear approved safety helmets instead of traditional hats and caps. Ideally white gloves should also be worn for a fully correct turnout, although many riders will wear black gloves while showing to make undesirable hand posture less conspicuous.

In the hunter ring, shadbellies have shorter, unweighted tails, compared to the long-weighted dressage tails.
