= Belle Vue Circus =

British circus (1922–1981)

Origin
- Circus name: Belle Vue International Circus
- Country: England
- Year founded: 1922

Information
- Ringmaster(s): George Claude Lockhart

Belle Vue Circus, also known as Belle Vue International Circus, was an annual British circus held in Manchester, England, which lasted for nearly sixty years from 1922 until 1981.

== History ==
The circus, operating out of Belle Vue Zoological Gardens in Belle Vue, Manchester, progressed from informal zoo shows in the late 1800s to the official Belle Vue Circus from 1922 to 1981.

The Belle Vue International Circus was first introduced by George Jennison in 1922. After an unsuccessful debut that year, the Belle Vue Circus returned in 1929 when the zoological gardens collaborated with the Blackpool Tower Circus. The Blackpool Tower supplied the circus with acts, equipment, and its resident ringmaster George Claude Lockhart, leading to great success. At the first annual Belle Vue Circus, George Claude Lockhart served as the ringmaster. He was among the most recognized figures in the circus.

The Belle Vue Circus took place intermittently at the Kings Hall in Belle Vue. The arena's seating capacity was 8,000.

The circus gained international fame. The managing director of Belle Vue scouted Europe to secure top talent. A successful mix of acts from all over the world combined to form an always-popular program. The King's Hall event mixed circus tradition with vaudeville, featuring international performers from Sweden, Spain, India, France, and Canada who brought fresh techniques to English audiences. In line with management policy, the early shows featured no wild animal acts, focusing instead on acrobats, clowns, gymnasts, riders, and trapeze performers.

The major Christmas attraction typically began a six-week run in late December and continued until early February. The inaugural circus at King's Hall during the 1929–1930 winter season drew such crowds that the show was extended an extra week. Ten times, the hall filled before the show began, turning away thousands. An investment of $25,000 had been made before the first event was planned.

George C. Lockhart remained a key ringmaster at Belle Vue through the 1960s, joined by Roberto Germains, from a long circus lineage. Fred Bonelli, who had been with the circus since its beginning, conducted the band. After more than four decades with the circus, Lockhart retired in 1970 at age 83. He returned to Belle Vue Circus in January 1979, receiving VIP treatment as a legendary figure of the "Big Top."

Belle Vue Circus, by 1978, was believed to be the longest-running wintertime show in the United Kingdom, with Norman Barrett as ringmaster. The final circus at the King's Hall, Belle Vue, took place in 1981.

Belle Vue's International Christmas Circus remained a popular feature at the world-famous zoological gardens for over half a century.

== See also ==
- List of circuses and circus owners
