= Stock tie =

Style of neck wear

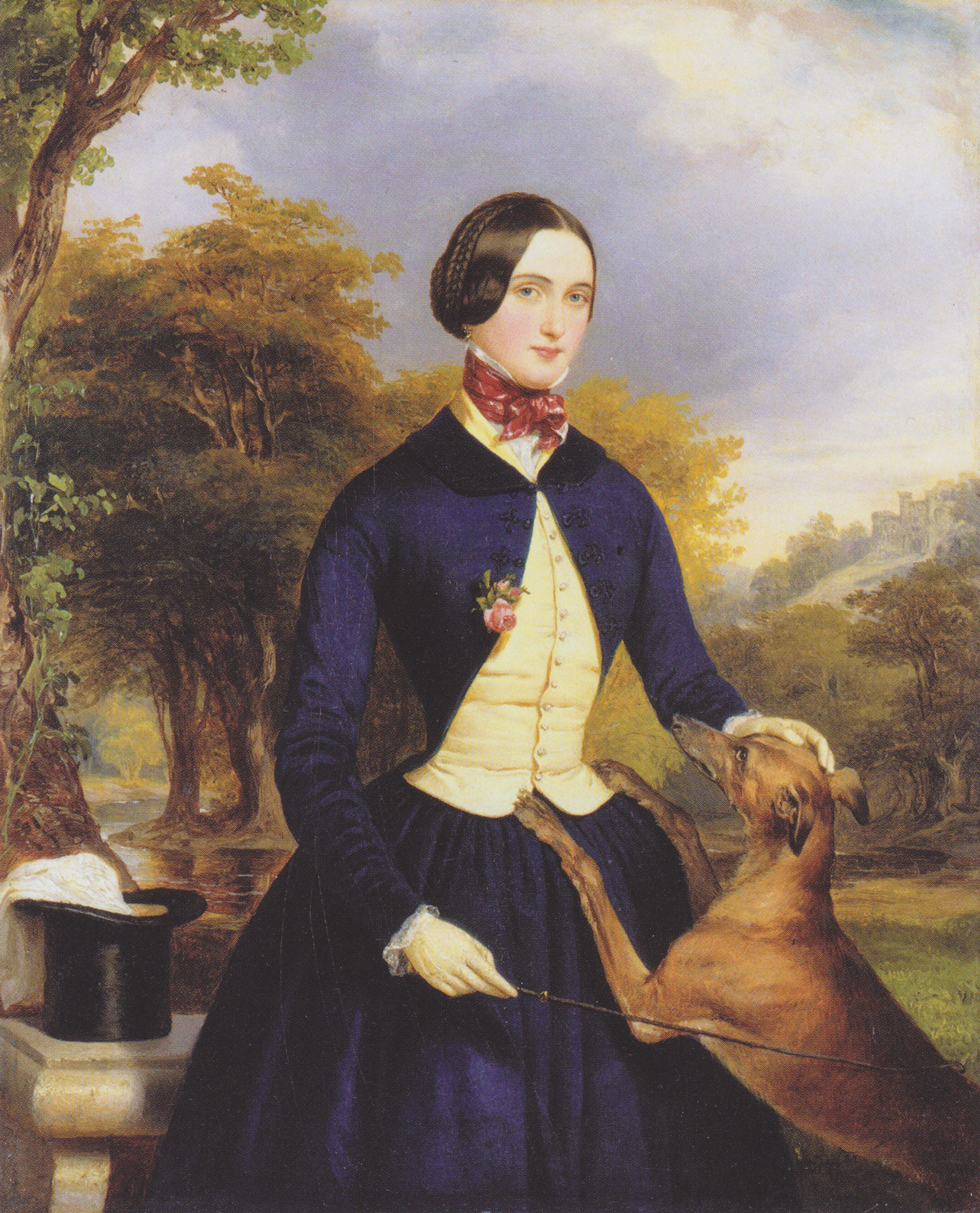
A woman in an equestrian riding habit with a stock tie around her neck

A stock tie, or stock, is a style of neck wear. Originally a form of neck-cloth that was often stiffened and usually close-fitting, formerly worn by men generally, but post-nineteenth century only in use in military uniforms. Another type of stock is worn by certain clergy and consists of black silk or other fabric, that falls over the chest and is secured by a band around the neck. Equestrians wear a stock tie around the neck when dressed formally for a hunt or certain competitive events. Most equestrian competition rules require it to be white. It is mandated attire for use in dressage and the dressage phase of eventing. Use of the stock tie is also seen in show jumping and fox hunting. The stock tie continues to be in fashion for equestrians.

== History ==
The stock tie was worn by gentlemen as everyday apparel in the eighteenth and nineteenth centuries. It became more of a formal tie in the later nineteenth century. These old stock ties often were black or white. They were made of gauze, fine cotton, or silk. Sometimes the stock tie was starched or otherwise reinforced to be stiff around the neck; with the chin forced up, it was presumed that the wearer would look more important and formal.

Traditionally, the stock tie is used in the hunt field as a safety measure: in case of injury, the tie may be used as a temporary bandage for a horse's leg or a sling for a rider's arm. It also is useful in keeping rain or wind out of the rider's collar. Stock ties often are worn by riders along with a shadbelly.

Some stock ties buckled or hooked up the back, and sometimes had bows or ruffles attached to the front.

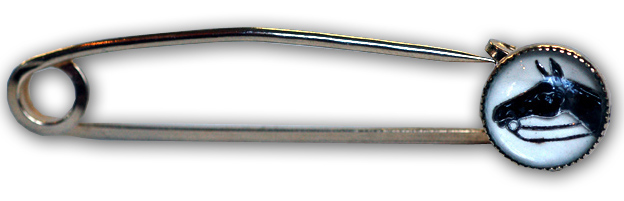
A contemporary stock pin

Today it is worn with a pin (usually plain and gold, although more elaborate pins also are seen). The pin is stuck through the knot or just below the knot and derives its name from the tie, being called a "stock pin".

== In popular culture ==
- Lalla Ward wore an ivory stock tie when playing Romana in the Doctor Who episode The Horns of Nimon.
- Stock ties were worn by many characters when horse riding in Downton Abbey.
- An ivory stock tie was worn when horse riding by Beryl Stapleton in the 1939 and 1983 films based on Sir Arthur Conan Doyle's The Hound of the Baskervilles.

== See also ==
- Cravat (early)
- Cravat (modern)
- Stock (military), a leather collar worn by soldiers during the 18th century
