= Samuel Lockhart =

Samuel Lockhart (1851–1933) was a famous Victorian elephant trainer and the second child of the famous Lockhart circus family. His work with elephants took him all over the UK, including Royal command performances in front of Queen Victoria, Europe (where he ran his own circus France) and in the USA, where he worked for the famous Ringling Brothers Circus from 1896 to 1901. He has appeared in several historical books on the circus, including one children's book completely dedicated to him (Elephants at Royal Leamington Spa by Janet Storrie, 1990), and the English town of Leamington Spa has several areas named after his most famous group of elephants "The Three Graces".

== Early career ==
Sam Lockhart was the second son of Sam and Hannah Locker (née Pinder). His father was a stilt-walking clown and his mother was the sister of the founders of the famous French Circus Pinder. The family name was changed to Lockhart on the advice of his mother (source: The Legend of Salt and Sauce, Pre-publication Jamie Clubb, Aardvark Publishing circ. 2008). Sam and his elder brother, George William Lockhart worked as bareback riders, clowns and acrobats. According to Janet Storrie's children's book "Elephants at Royal Leamington Spa", Sam performed the incredible feat of being shot from a cannon onto a trapeze. He was reported to be of small stature, standing only 5 foot tall. According to "The Victorian Arena" by John Turner the two were featured on Ginnett's Circus working the parallel bars. In 1875 George Lockhart fell from his horse and broke his hip (source, Les Histories de Cirque, Jacques Garnier, 1978), which brought their act to an end. Sam returned home, but got work in Sri Lanka on a tea plantation. There he learnt how to train elephants. He also acquired a lot of money. He was then able to buy elephants and form an elephant act.

== Sam Lockhart's Elephants ==
Sam Lockhart had tremendous success with his elephant acts. His most famous group were known as "The Three Graces": Wilhelmina and two younger elephants, Trilby and Haddie. Haddie (or Hattie) was also the nickname for his wife, Harriet Alice (who died In 1897). He also had two bull elephants called Romeo and Charley. His other famous elephants were Jock and Jenny, who were worked in front of Queen Victoria. He worked in the USA for the famous Ringling Circus from 1896 to 1901, as well as doing the Vaudeville circuit. His acts with Ringling were billed with phrases such as "Ringling Bro's marvelous acting Pachyderms", "Lockhart Elephant Comedians" and "Prof. Lockhart's funny, dancing, pantomimic, play-acting elephants".

== Sam Lockhart Landmarks in Leamington Spa ==
Plaques for Leamington "Old Town" feature elephants in honour of Sam Lockhart's elephants. A monument was erected in 2006 of Sam Lockhart's "3 Graces" that was vandalised the same year. A recent luxury flat development by A C Lloyd that was built after demolishing Sam Lockhart's home at 1, Warwick Road was named Wilhelmina Close after one of the "3 Graces". Elephant Walk is a nickname given to a sloping walkway to the River Leam, where the elephants regularly bathed.(There is no evidence that the elephants bathed here at all).

== Books featuring Sam Lockhart ==
- Grey Titan, The. Book of Elephants, George Lockhart Jnr and W. G. Bosworth, 1938.
- Elephants in Royal Leamington Spa, Janet Storrie, Weir Books, 1990. - entire children's book on Sam Lockhart and his elephants.
- The Victorian Arena: The Performers Volumes 1 and 2, John Turner, Lingdale’s Press 1995 and 2000 respectively.
- 20th Century Arena: The Performers, John Turner (unpublished to date).
- The Legend of Salt and Sauce, Jamie Clubb, Aardvark Publishing 2008
