= Bertram Mills =

British circus owner

Bertram Wagstaff Mills (August 1873 – 16 April 1938) was a British circus owner originally from Paddington, London, who ran the Bertram Mills Circus. His circus became famous in the UK for its Christmas shows at Olympia in West London televised in 1938, 1946 and 1947. His troupe was the last to perform with live animals on the Drury Lane Theatre stage.

== Early life ==
Born in August 1873, Bertram was the son of Halford Mills of Paddington, London, an undertaker and the owner of the Reformed Funeral Company, a coach-building works, and the Undertakers Journal. Halford Mills was described as a "pioneer of embalming". Bertram was brought up on two small farms at Chalfont St. Giles (which his father owned for the purpose of sending his horses there to rest), where he developed his passion for horseback riding.

He left school aged 15 and started washing down the coaches for the family business, which was started by his grandfather (who used to be an evangelical preacher). Within a year, he was driving a four-in-hand from London to Oxford wearing a cornflower in his morning coat, for which he later became recognised.

== Career ==
He continued working for the family firm until the outbreak of World War I, when he joined and served with the Royal Army Medical Corps, rising to the rank of captain.

On leaving the army, he became interested in the "Wilkins and Young Circus". He made a wager with a friend that he could form a circus company and within a year be as good as they were. He did just that, thus the "Bertram Mills International Circus" was formed.

The circus very quickly became a household name, and the annual Christmas event became especially well-known. He made a point of inviting orphans to see the shows free. By 1930 (its heyday would last for the next 30 years, when it was the best and most famous live show), he had inaugurated a touring circus, which became unique amongst British circuses, always appearing at Olympia for the Christmas season. VistaScreen released three different series of stereoviews featuring the circus.

The guest lists indicate the show's renown; the royal family, who were great supporters, attended every year, and Winston Churchill and similar dignitaries were also annual guests.

== Personal life and family ==
Bertram Mills married his wife, Ethel (d. 1960), in 1901. They were parents of a daughter and two sons, Bernard Notley and Cyril Bertram Mills. After their father's death on 16 April 1938 aged 64, both Bernard and Cyril took over running the Bertram Mills Circus, sustaining its success until the early 1960s, when it was finally disbanded due to widespread television viewing. Cyril Mills served with MI5 during World War II and was the spymaster who controlled Juan Pujol Garcia, codenamed "Garbo".

Bertram Mills was cremated (his father had been one of the first three undertakers to offer this service in London) and is buried with his wife at Chalfont St Giles in Buckinghamshire, England.
